= Ippommatsu Station =

Ippommatsu Station may be:

- Ippommatsu Station (Saitama), a station on the Tobu Ogose Line in Japan
- Ippommatsu Station (Fukuoka), a station on the JR Hitahikosan Line in Japan
