= Bushū-Nagase Station =

Railway station in Moroyama, Saitama Prefecture, Japan

TJ44 Bushū-Nagase Station 武州長瀬駅
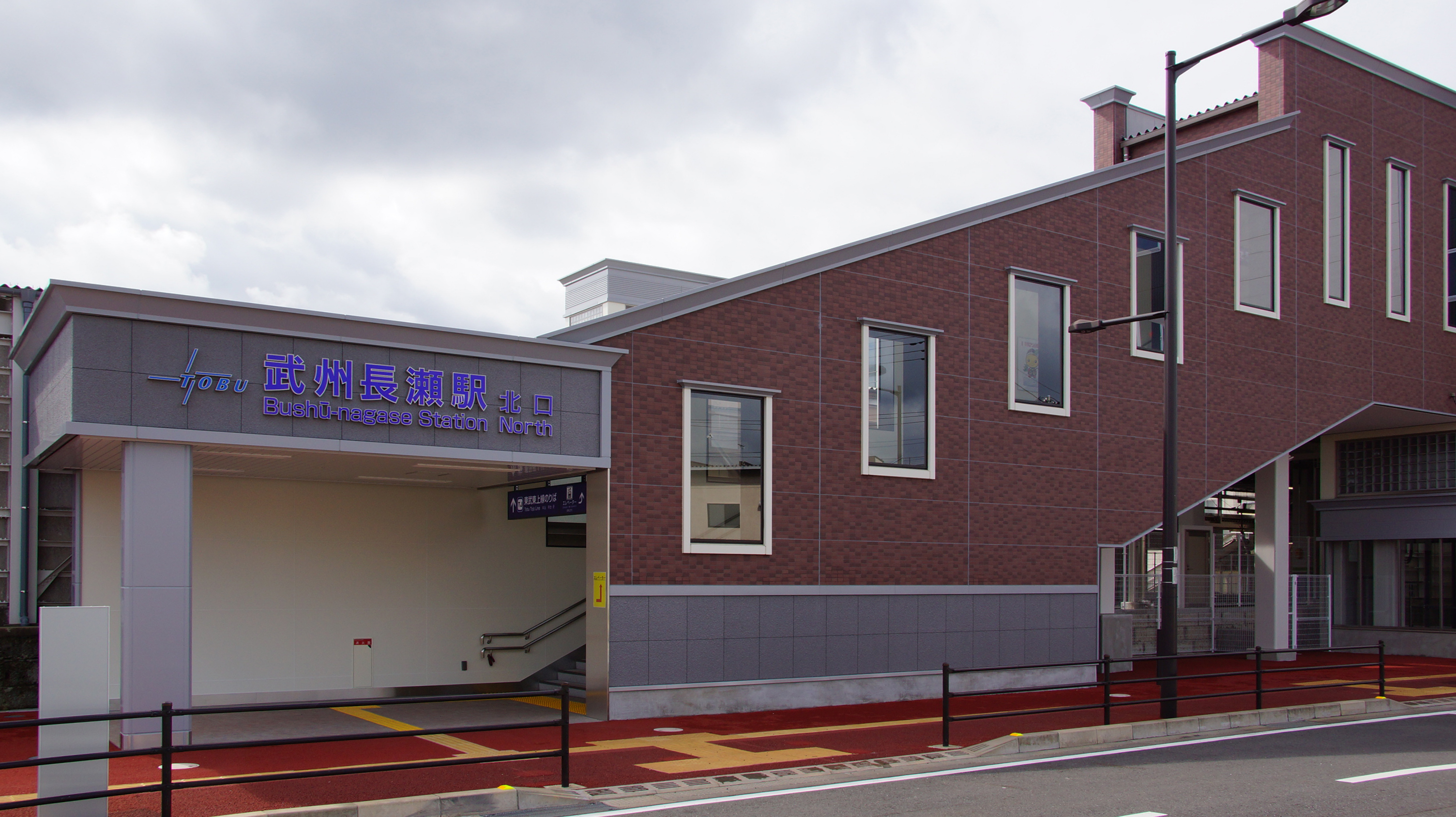
- Bushū-Nagase Station north entrance in October 2013

General information
- Location: 1-62-1 Wakayama, Moroyama-machi, Iruma-gun, Saitama-ken 350–0462; Japan
- Coordinates: 35.942003°N 139.325378°E
- Operator: Tōbu Railway
- Line: Tōbu Ogose Line
- Distance: 7.6 km from Sakado
- Platforms: 2 side platforms
- Tracks: 2

Other information
- Station code: TJ-44
- Website: Official website

History
- Opened: 16 December 1934
- Rebuilt: 2013

Passengers
- FY2019: 4,353 daily

Services
Preceding station	Tobu Railway	Following station
Higashi-Moro TJ45 towards Ogose	Ogose Line	Kawakado TJ43 towards Sakado
Location
- Location within Saitama Prefecture Location within Japan

Bushū-Nagase Station (武州長瀬駅, Bushū-nagase-eki) is a passenger railway station located in the town of Moroyama, Saitama, Japan, operated by the private railway operator Tōbu Railway.

== Lines ==
Bushū-Nagase Station is served by the Tōbu Ogose Line, a 10.9 km predominantly single-track branchline running from Sakado to Ogose, and is situated 7.6 km from Sakado. During the daytime, the station is served by four trains per hour in each direction.

== Station layout ==
The station consists of two side platforms serving two tracks forming a passing loop on the single-track line.

The station was rebuilt between 2012 and 2013 with a new station structure above the tracks, enabling station entrances to be built on both the north and south sides.

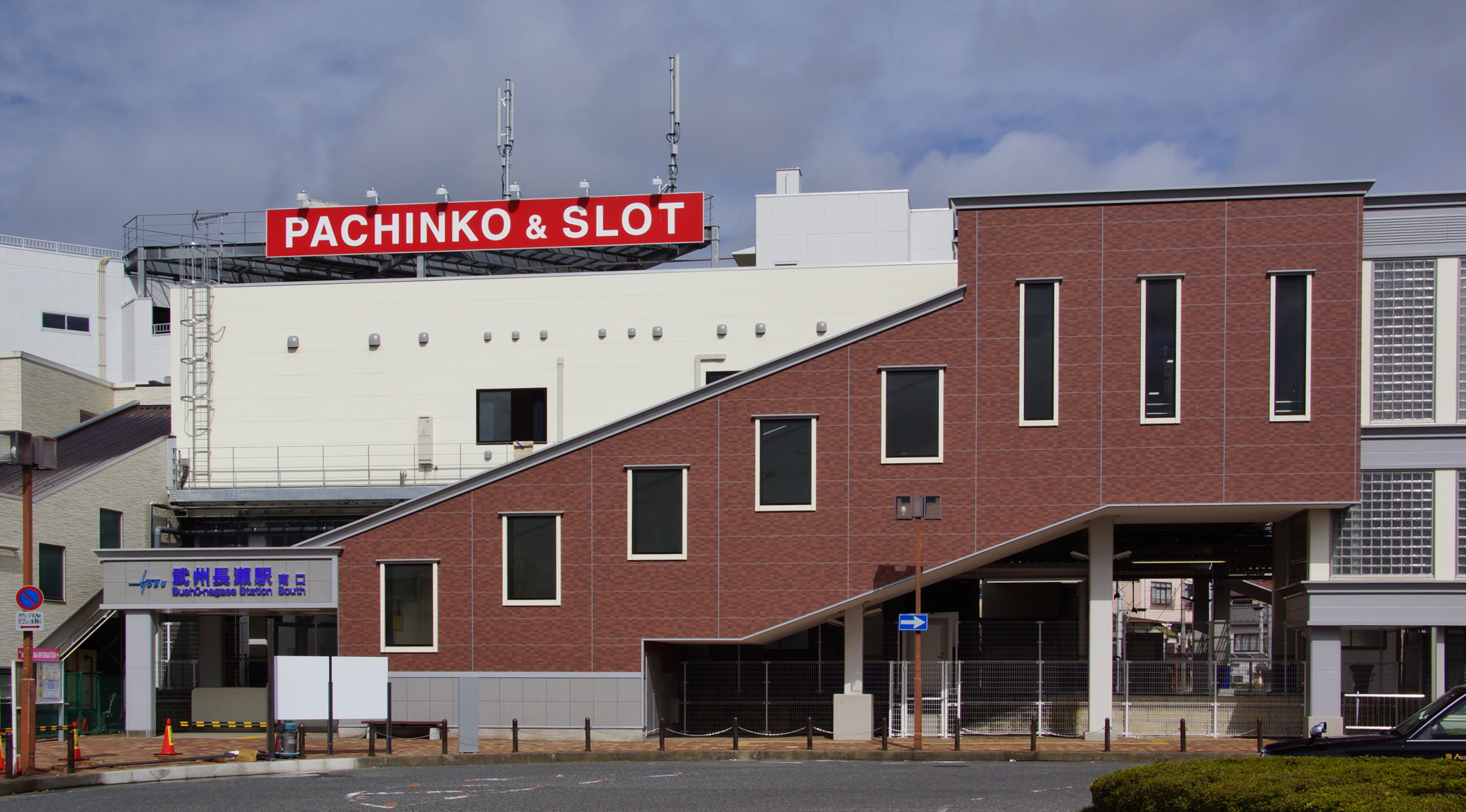
The south entrance in October 2013

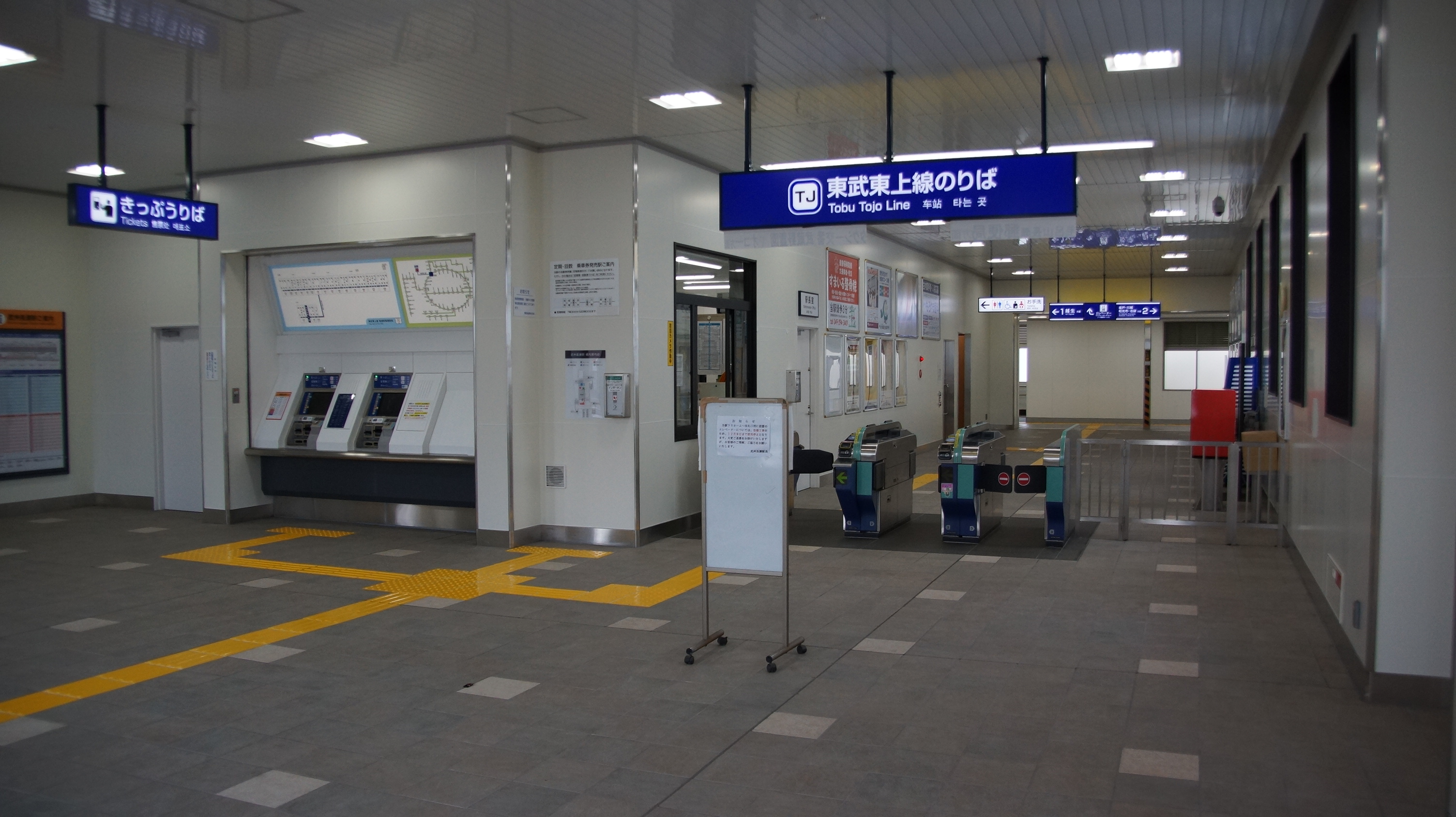
Ticket vending machines and ticket barriers in October 2013

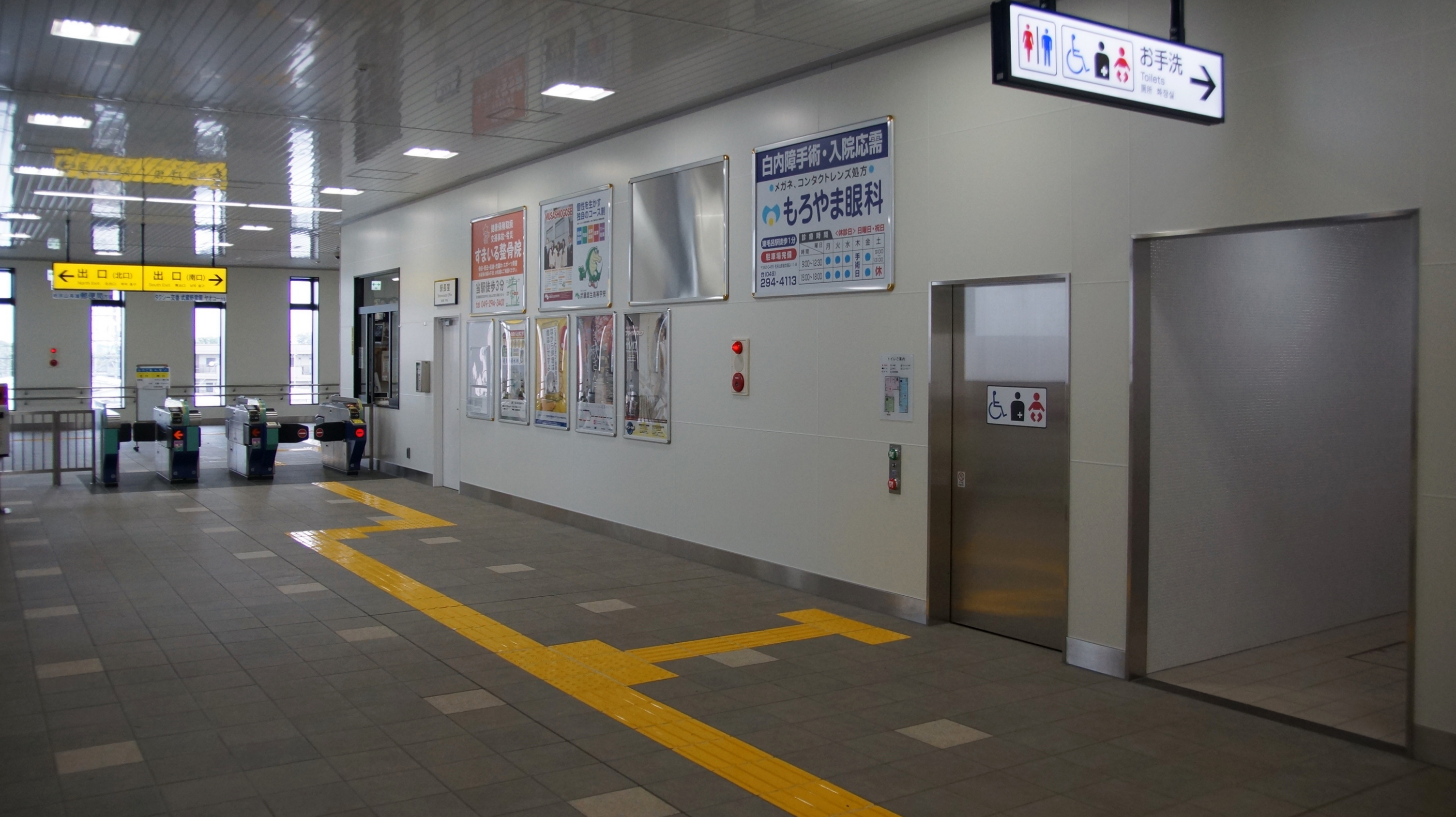
The station toilets in October 2013

=== Platforms ===
1	■ Tōbu Ogose Line	for Ogose
2	■ Tōbu Ogose Line	for Sakado

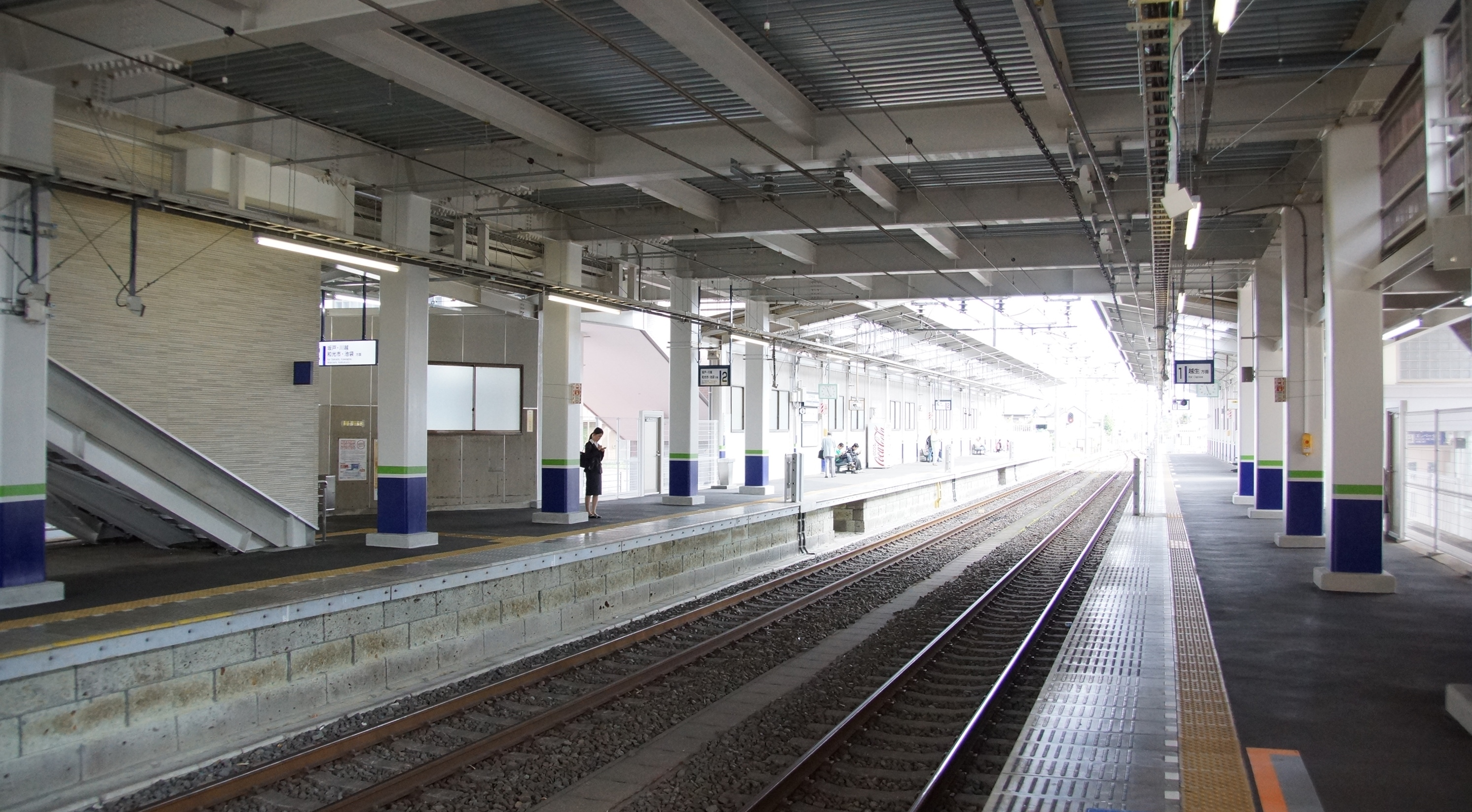
Platform 1 from the down (Ogose) end in October 2013

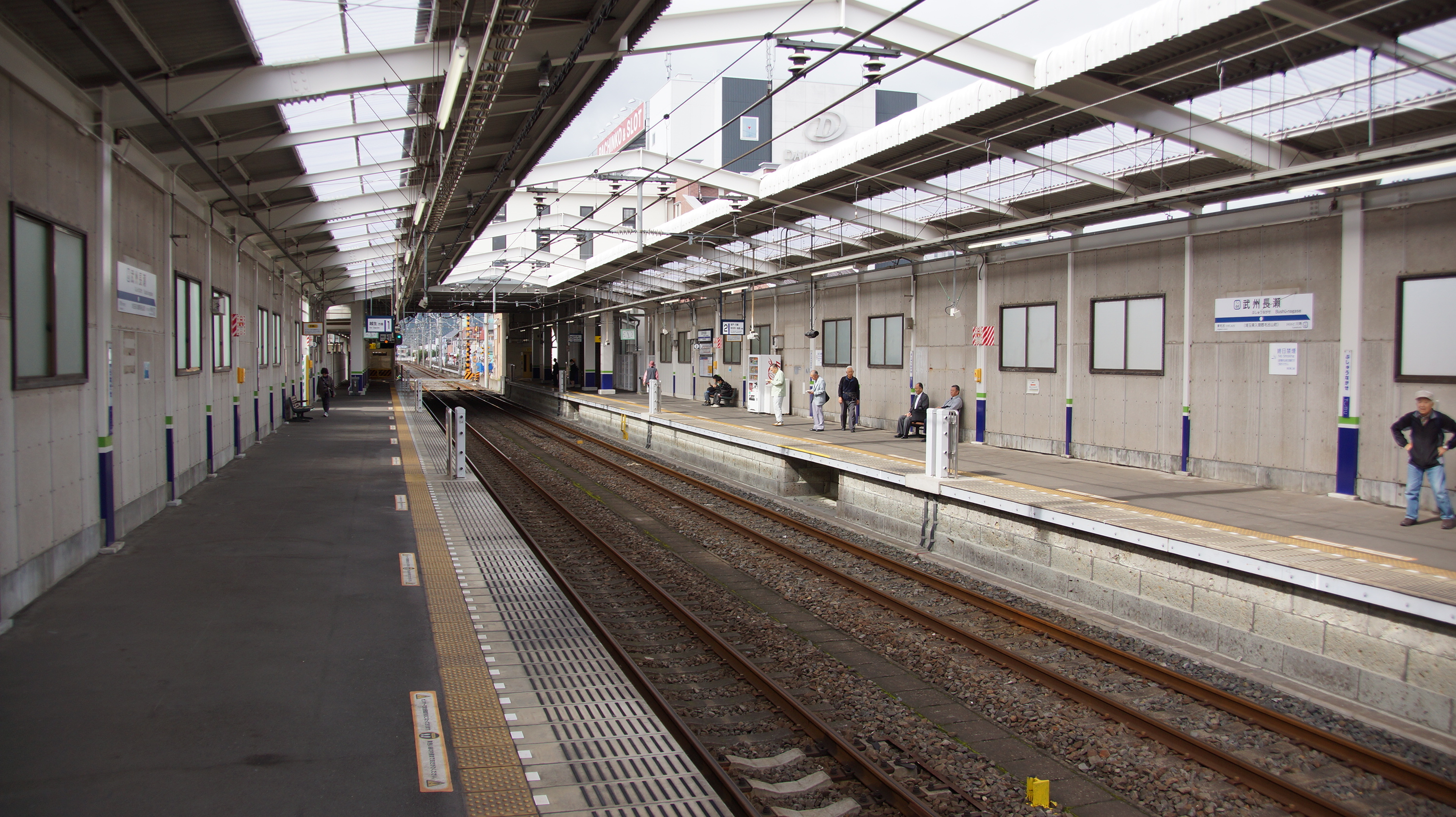
Platform 1 from the up (Sakado) end in October 2013

== History ==
The station opened on 16 December 1934.

Platform edge sensors and TV monitors were installed in 2008 ahead of the start of driver-only operation on the Ogose Line from June 2008.

From 17 March 2012, station numbering was introduced on the Tōbu Ogose Line, with Bushū-Nagase Station becoming "TJ-44".

A new overhead station building opened on 5 October 2013.

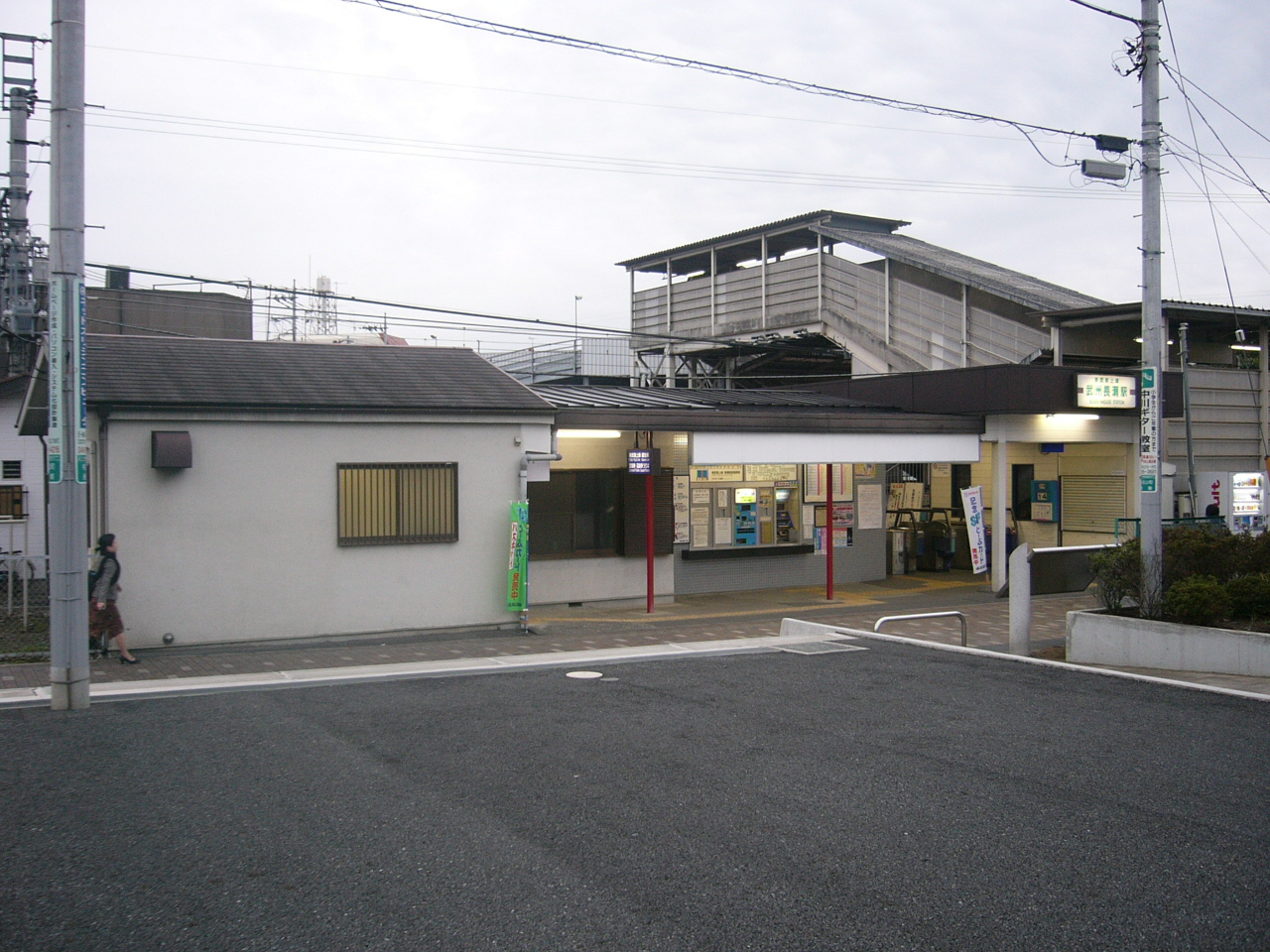
The station entrance in November 2004, before the addition of lifts

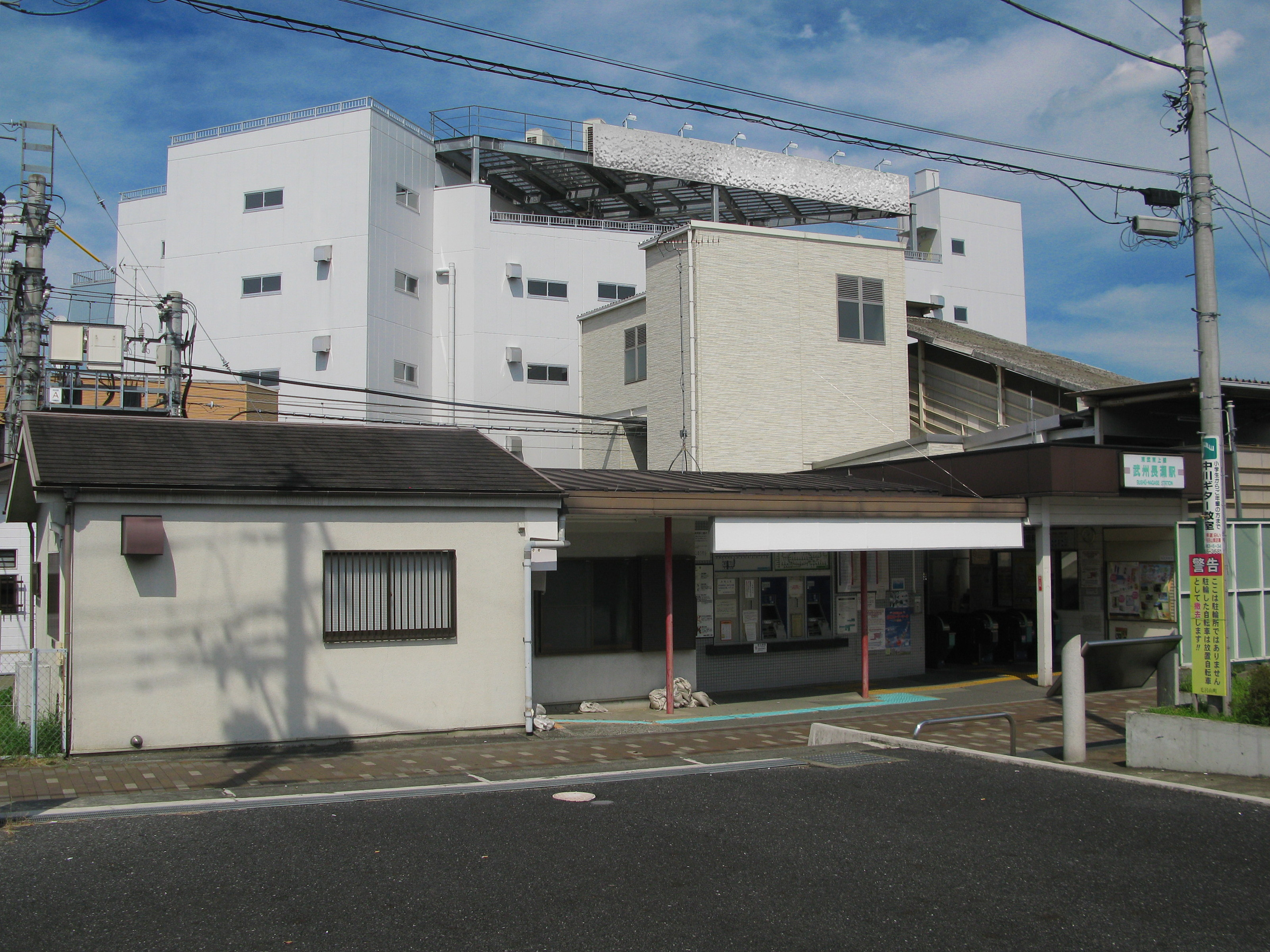
The station entrance in September 2012, after the addition of lifts

== Passenger statistics ==
In fiscal 2019, the station was used by an average of 4,353 passengers daily.

== Surrounding area ==
- Atarashiki-mura residential community

== Bus services ==
Higashi-Moro Station is served by the "Moro Bus" community minibus (Yuzu Yellow Line) service.

== See also ==
- List of railway stations in Japan
