= Ippommatsu Station (Saitama) =

Railway station in Tsurugashima, Saitama Prefecture, Japan

TJ41 Ippommatsu Station 一本松駅
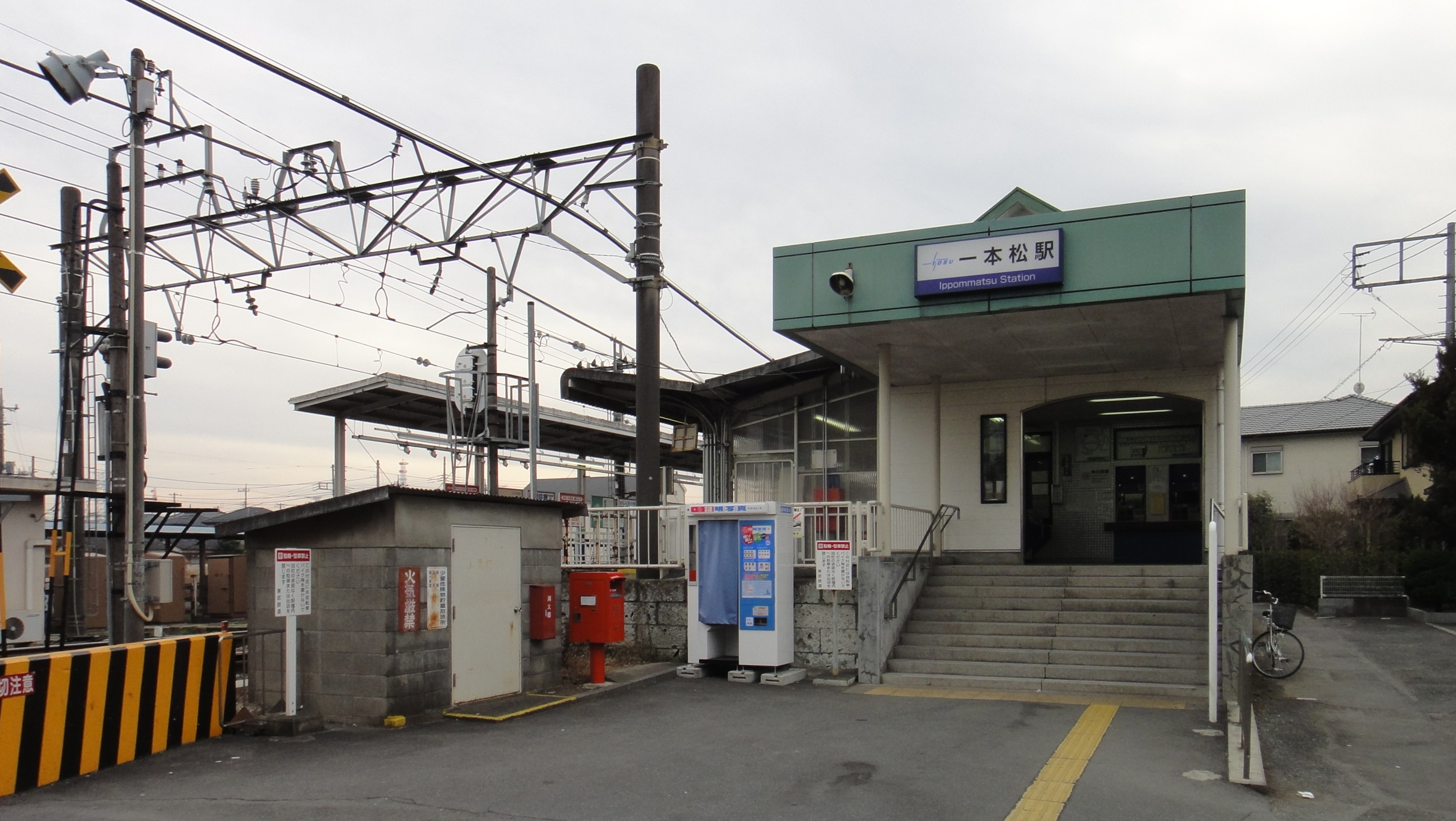
- Ippommatsu Station entrance in January 2014

General information
- Location: 80-3 Nakashinden, Tsurugashima-shi, Saitama-ken 350–2226; Japan
- Coordinates: 35°56′25″N 139°22′13″E
- Operator: Tōbu Railway
- Line: Tōbu Ogose Line
- Distance: 2.8 km from Sakado
- Platforms: 2 side platforms
- Tracks: 2

Other information
- Station code: TJ-41
- Website: Official website

History
- Opened: 16 December 1934

Passengers
- FY2019: 4,451 daily

Services
Preceding station	Tobu Railway	Following station
Nishi-Ōya TJ42 towards Ogose	Ogose Line	Sakado TJ26 Terminus
Location
- Location within Saitama Prefecture Location within Japan

Ippommatsu Station (一本松駅, Ipponmatsu-eki) is a passenger railway station located in the city of Tsurugashima, Saitama, Japan, operated by the private railway operator Tōbu Railway.

== Lines ==
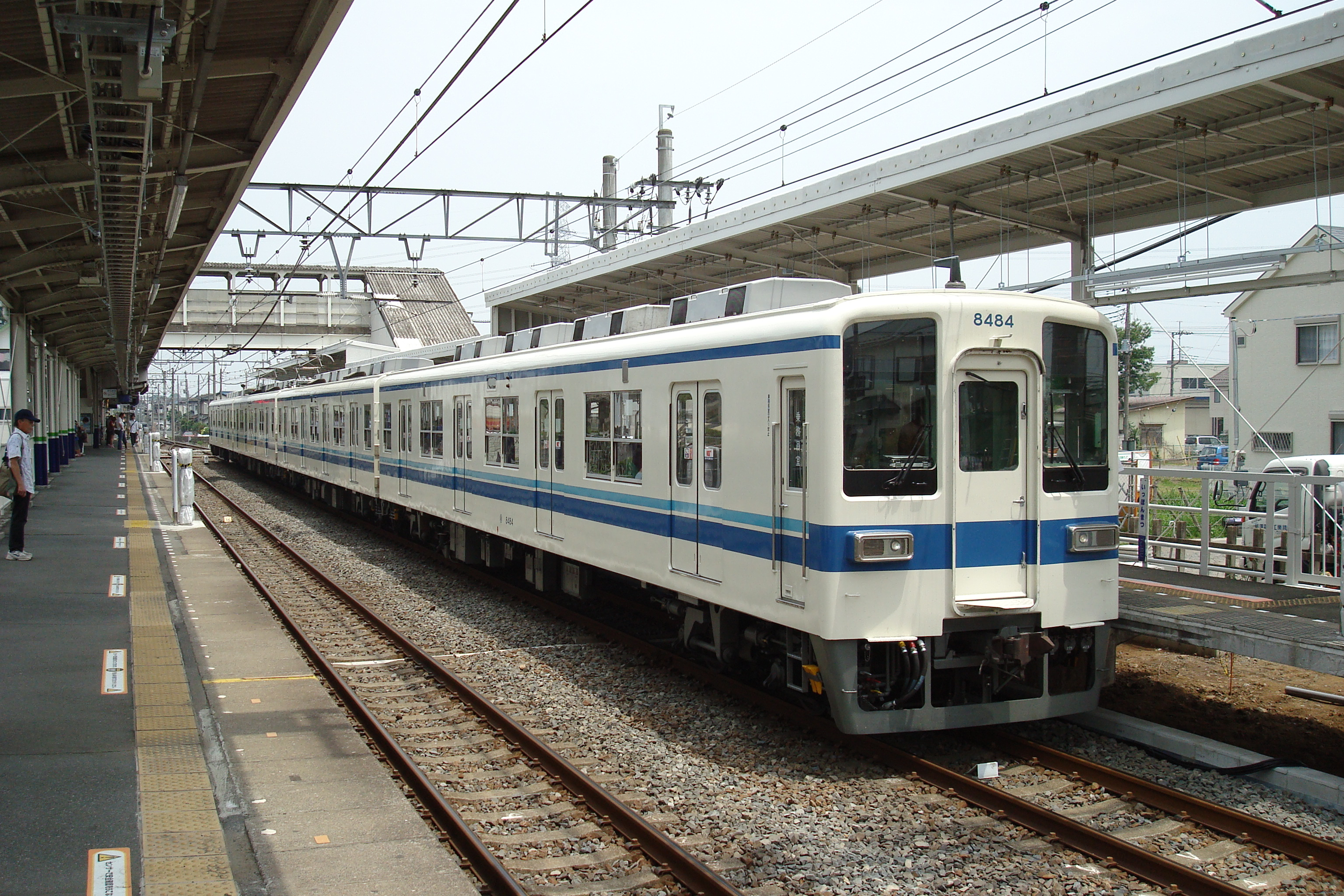
An 8000 series 4-car train at Ippommatsu Station on an Ogose-bound service in May 2008

Ippommatsu Station is served by the Tōbu Ogose Line, a 10.9 km single-track branchline running from Sakado to Ogose, and is located 2.8 km from the terminus at Sakado. During the daytime, the station is served by four trains per hour in each direction.

== Station layout ==
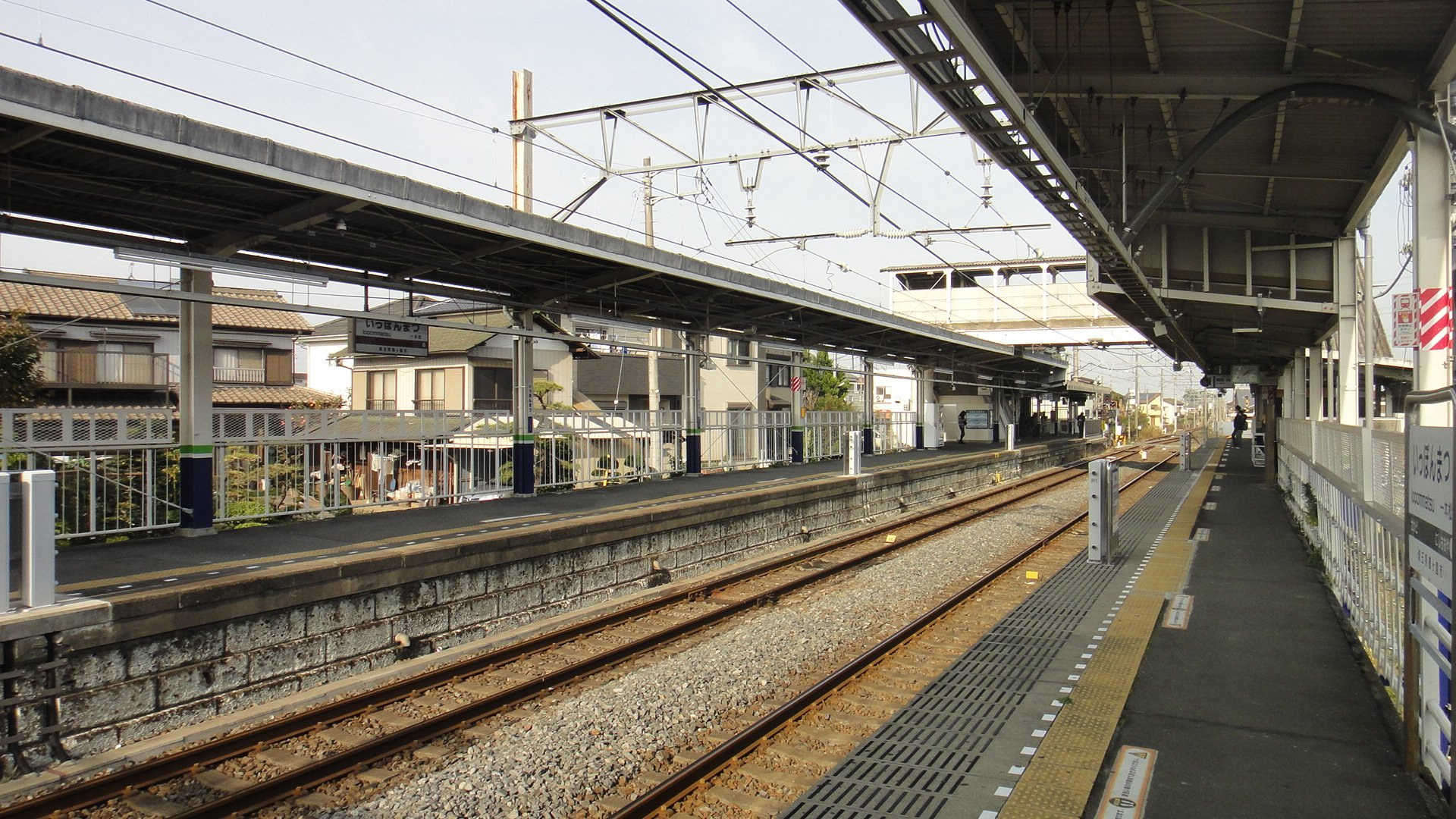
View from platform 1 looking eastward (toward Sakado) in November 2011

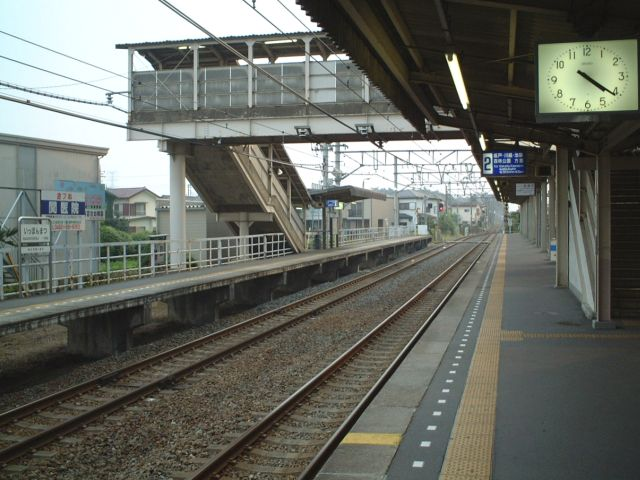
View from platform 2 looking westward before extension of platform roof and installation of platform edge sensors in August 2000

The station consists of two side platforms serving two tracks forming a passing loop on the single-track Ogose Line. The platforms are long enough for four-car trains. The single exit and station office is located at the Sakado end of the up (Sakado-bound) platform.

=== Platforms ===
1	■ Tōbu Ogose Line	for Nishi-Ōya, Kawakado, and Ogose
2	■ Tōbu Ogose Line	for Sakado

=== Facilities and accessibility ===
Toilets are located on the Sakado-bound platform (platform 2), but no universal access facilities are available. Access to the station and platforms is via steps, and no escalators or lifts are provided.

== History ==
The station opened on 16 December 1934, initially with a single platform on the single-track line. Ippommatsu Station takes its name from an intersection of roads about 150 metres to the northwest called "Ippommatsu Crossing". This intersection was named during the Edo Period for a single (ippon) pine tree (matsu) which stood nearby. Today, the crossing is a busy 5-way traffic intersection.

Ippommatsu became a staffed station from 17 May 1965.

Platform edge sensors and TV monitors were installed in 2008 ahead of the start of driver-only operation on the Ogose Line from June 2008. A roof was also added to the previously uncovered down (Ogose-bound) platform in 2008.

From 17 March 2012, station numbering was introduced on the Tōbu Ogose Line, with Ippommatsu Station becoming "TJ-41".

== Passenger statistics ==
In fiscal 2019, the station was used by an average of 4451 passengers daily.

The daily passenger figures for previous years are as shown below.

Fiscal year	Daily average
2010	4,176
2011	4,027
2012	4,062
2013	4,092
2014	4,041

== Surrounding area ==
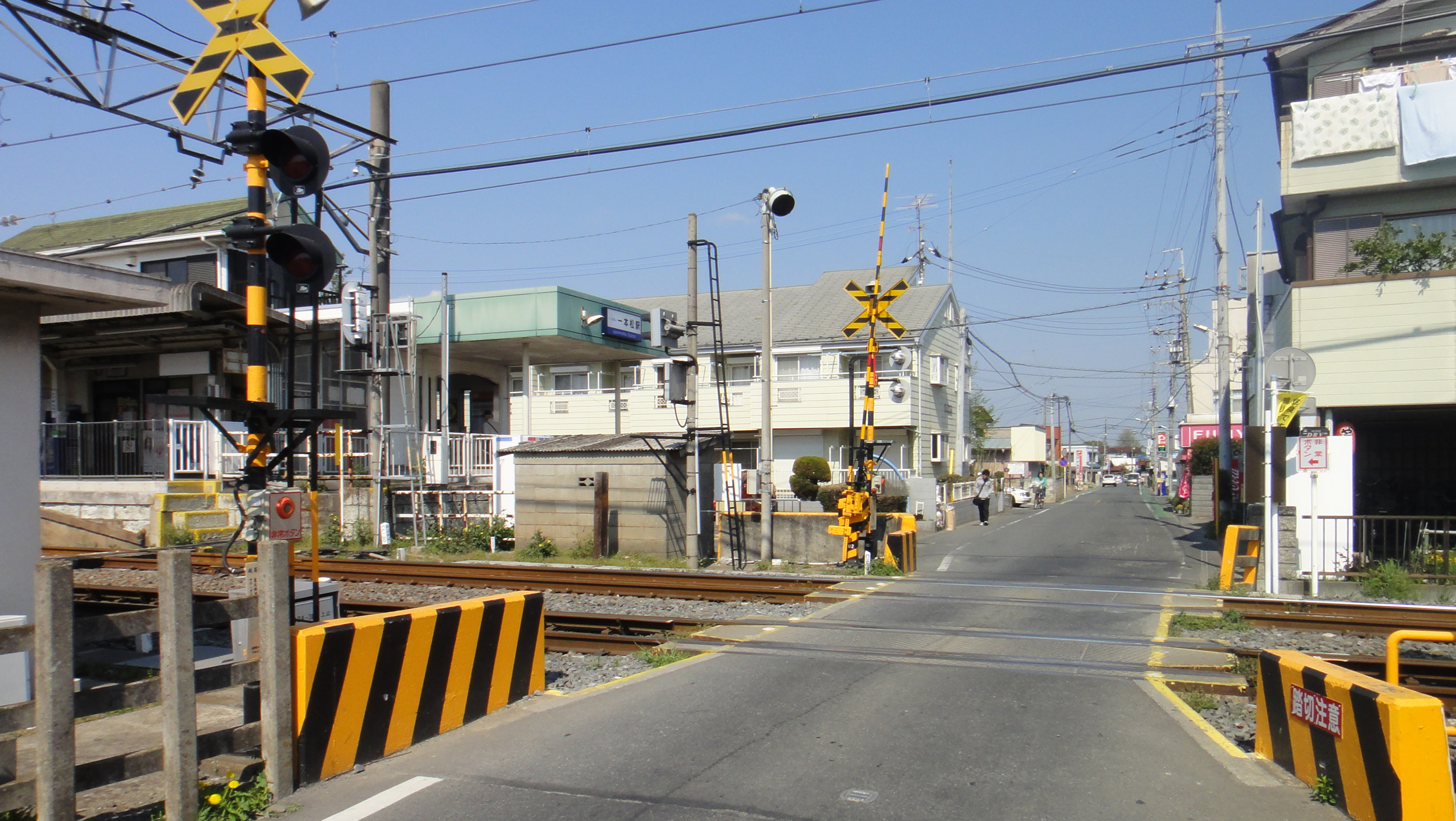
The single-lane level crossing immediately to the east of the station

Lying close to the boundary between Sakado and Tsurugashima cities, Ippommatsu Station's only exit opens onto a busy road which crosses the Ogose Line. A current problem is the narrowness of the road and the level crossing across the line. In the morning and at evening, pedestrian and vehicular traffic often become congested with commuters and students from nearby schools.

Other buildings in the area include:

- Sakado City Ōya Community Center
- Sakado Municipal Elementary School
- Tsurugashima City West Community Center
- Tsurugashima Seifū Senior High School
- Tsurugashima West Junior High School
- Shinchō Elementary School
- Tsurugashima Shimoshinden Post Office
- Sakado Morito Post Office

== Future developments ==
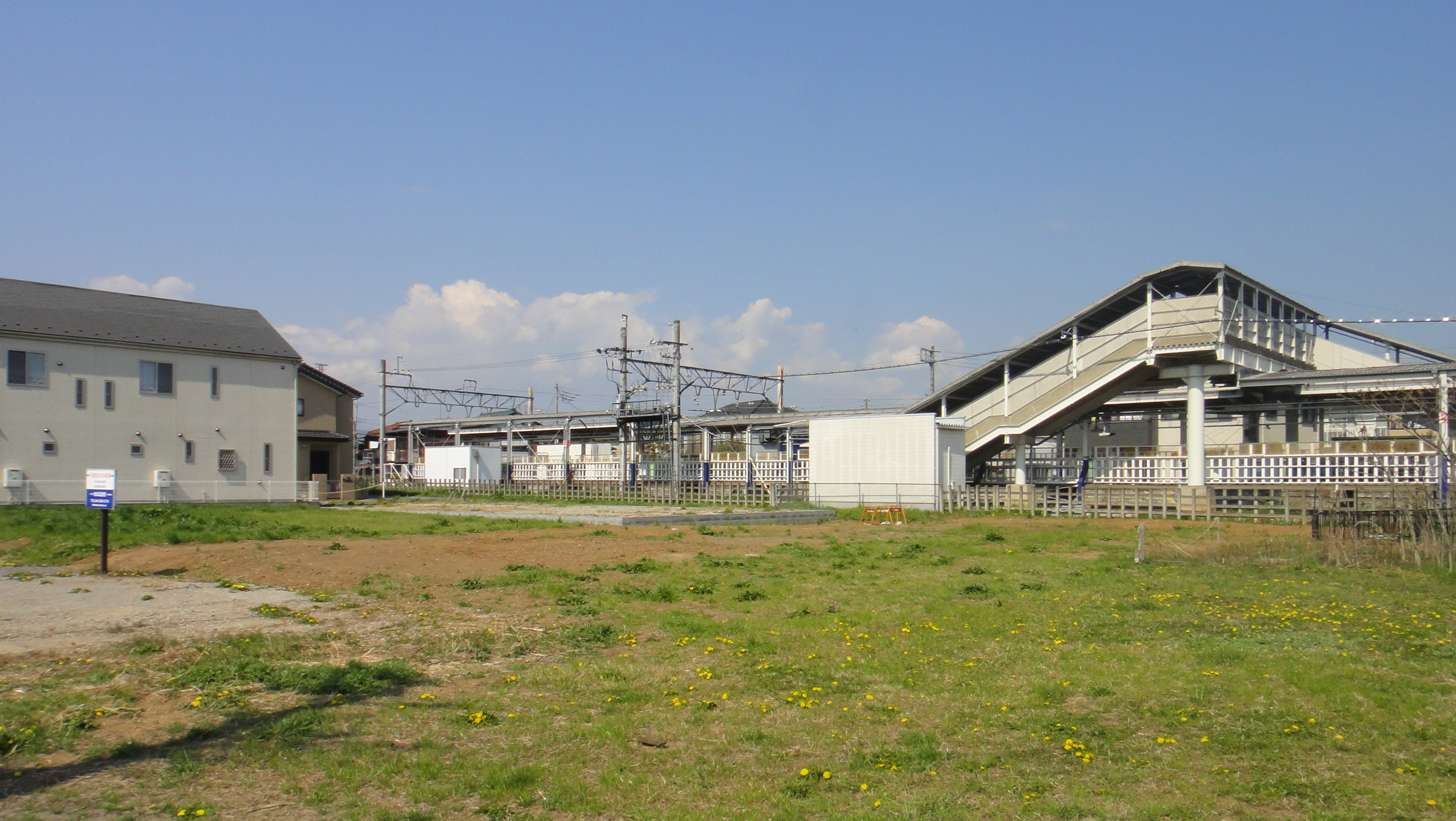
The land on the south side of the station reserved for future redevelopment, April 2014

The city of Tsurugashima is supporting future redevelopment of the station area, with plans to build a new overhead station structure and a station forecourt on the south side providing better vehicular access.

== See also ==
- List of railway stations in Japan
- Ippommatsu Station (Fukuoka), in Fukuoka Prefecture
