= Tobu Ogose Line =

Railway line in Japan

Ogose Line

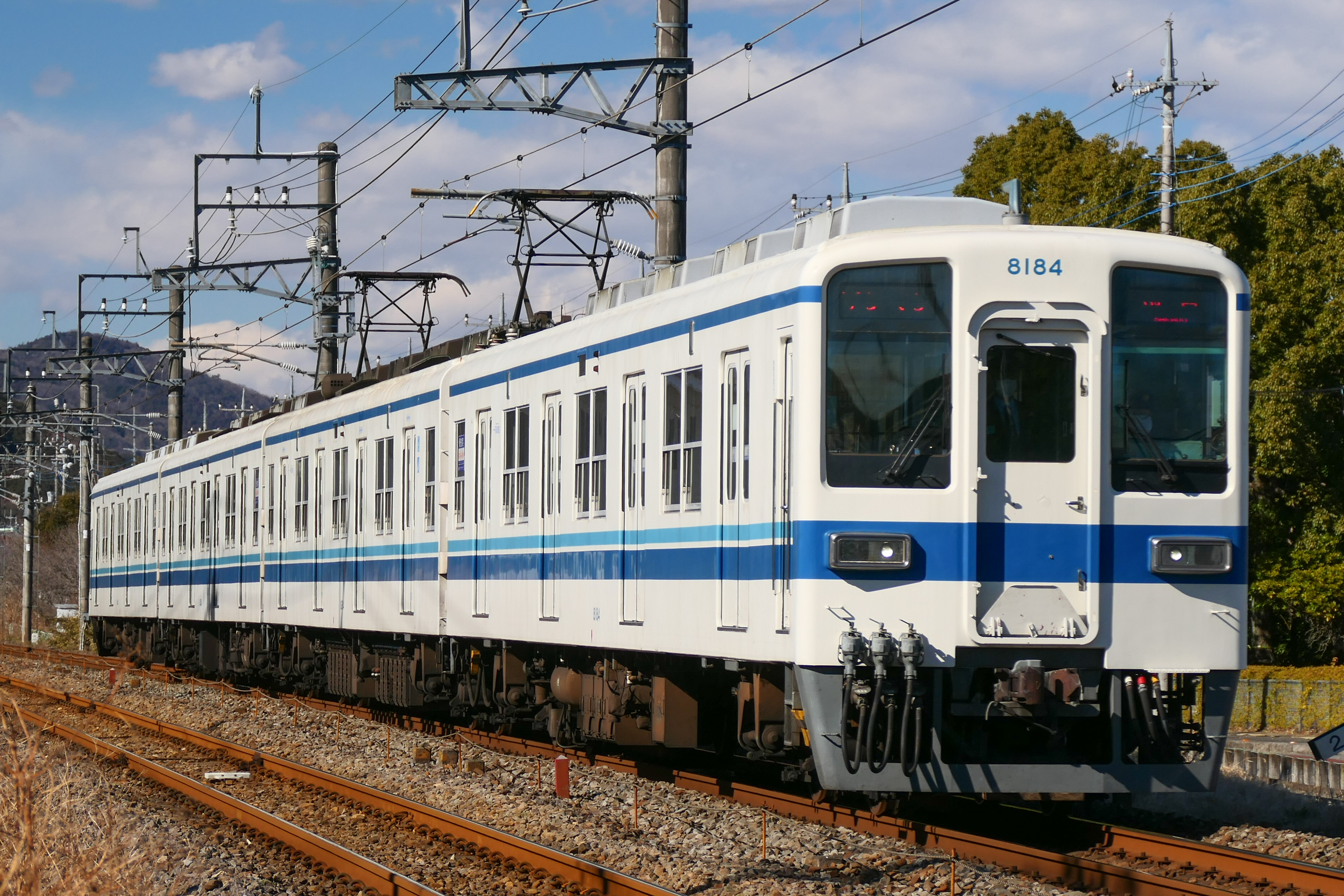
- An Ogose Line 8000 series EMU between Ogose and Bushū-Karasawa stations in January 2022

Overview
- Native name: 越生線
- Status: In service
- Owner: Tobu Railway Co., Ltd.
- Locale: Saitama Prefecture
- Termini: Sakado; Ogose
- Stations: 8

Service
- Type: Commuter rail
- System: Tobu Railway
- Route number: TJ
- Operator(s): Tobu Railway Co., Ltd.
- Depot: None
- Rolling stock: Tobu 8000 series

History
- Opened: 17 February 1932; 94 years ago

Technical
- Line length: 10.9 km (6.8 mi)
- Number of tracks: Single
- Track gauge: 1,067 mm (3 ft 6 in)
- Minimum radius: 205 m
- Electrification: 1,500 V DC, overhead catenary
- Operating speed: 90 km/h (55 mph)

The Ogose Line (越生線, Ogose-sen) is a 10.9-kilometre (6.8 mi), mostly single-track branch line in Saitama Prefecture, Japan, operated by the private railway operator Tobu Railway. It runs from Sakado Station on the Tojo Line to Ogose Station, connecting with the JR East Hachikō Line.

== Service outline ==
Service consists of four trains per hour in each direction during the daytime, increased to six trains per hour in the morning and evening peak periods. Services are formed of 4-car 8000 series electric multiple unit (EMU) trains.

== Stations ==
All stations are located in Saitama Prefecture.

No.	Name	Japanese	Distance (km)	Transfers	Location
TJ26	Sakado	坂戸	0.0	Tojo Line (TJ26)	Sakado
TJ41	Ippommatsu	一本松	2.8		Tsurugashima
TJ42	Nishi-Ōya	西大家	4.4		Sakado
TJ43	Kawakado	川角	5.6		Moroyama
TJ44	Bushū-Nagase	武州長瀬	7.6		Moroyama
TJ45	Higashi-Moro	東毛呂	8.6		Moroyama
TJ46	Bushū-Karasawa	武州唐沢	9.4		Ogose
TJ47	Ogose	越生	10.9	■ Hachikō Line	Ogose

=== Closed stations ===
- Ōya Station (大家駅), between Ippommatsu and Nishi-Ōya stations. Closed on 1 December 1945.

== Rolling stock ==
Since June 2008, all Ogose Line services are formed of four-car 8000 series EMU trains. 7300 series EMUs were used up until 1984, 7800 series EMUs were used up until 1985, 5000 series EMUs were used until 1990, and 10030 series and 10050 series EMUs were also used alongside the 8000 series trains until the start of driver-only operation in June 2008.

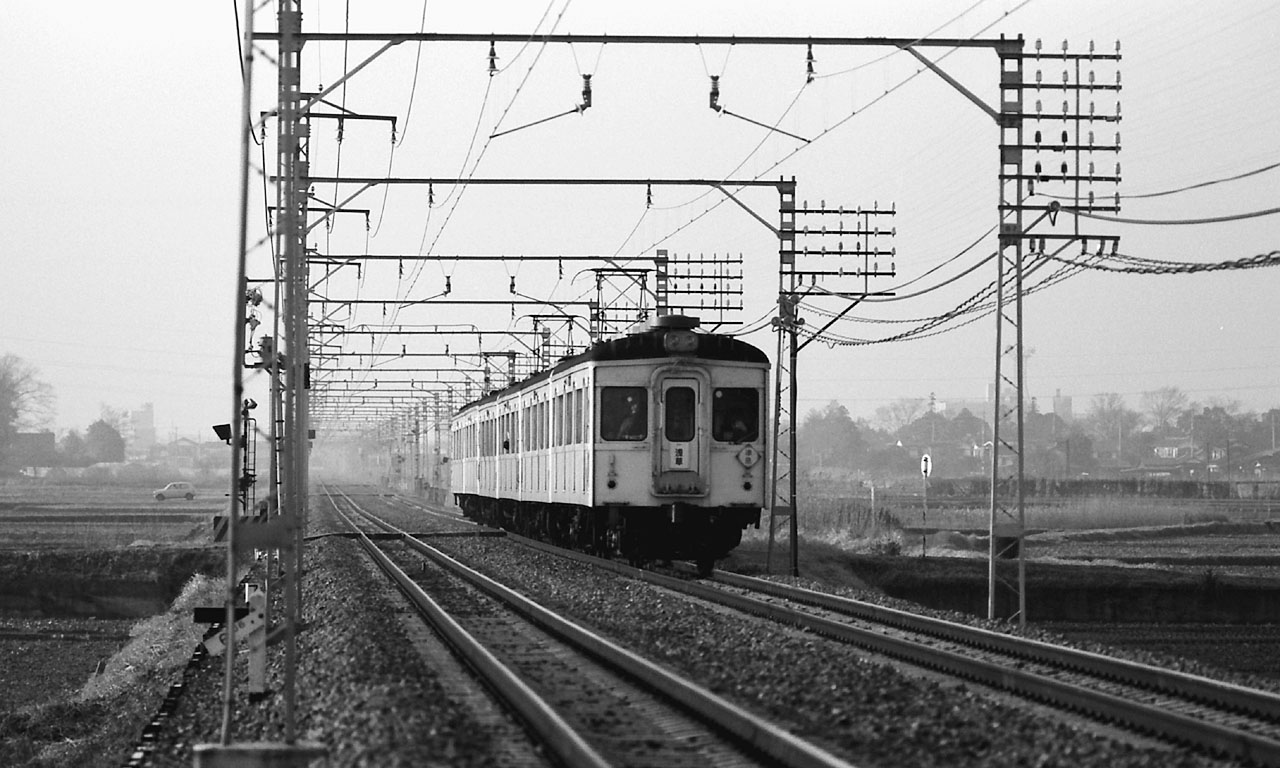
7300 series EMU

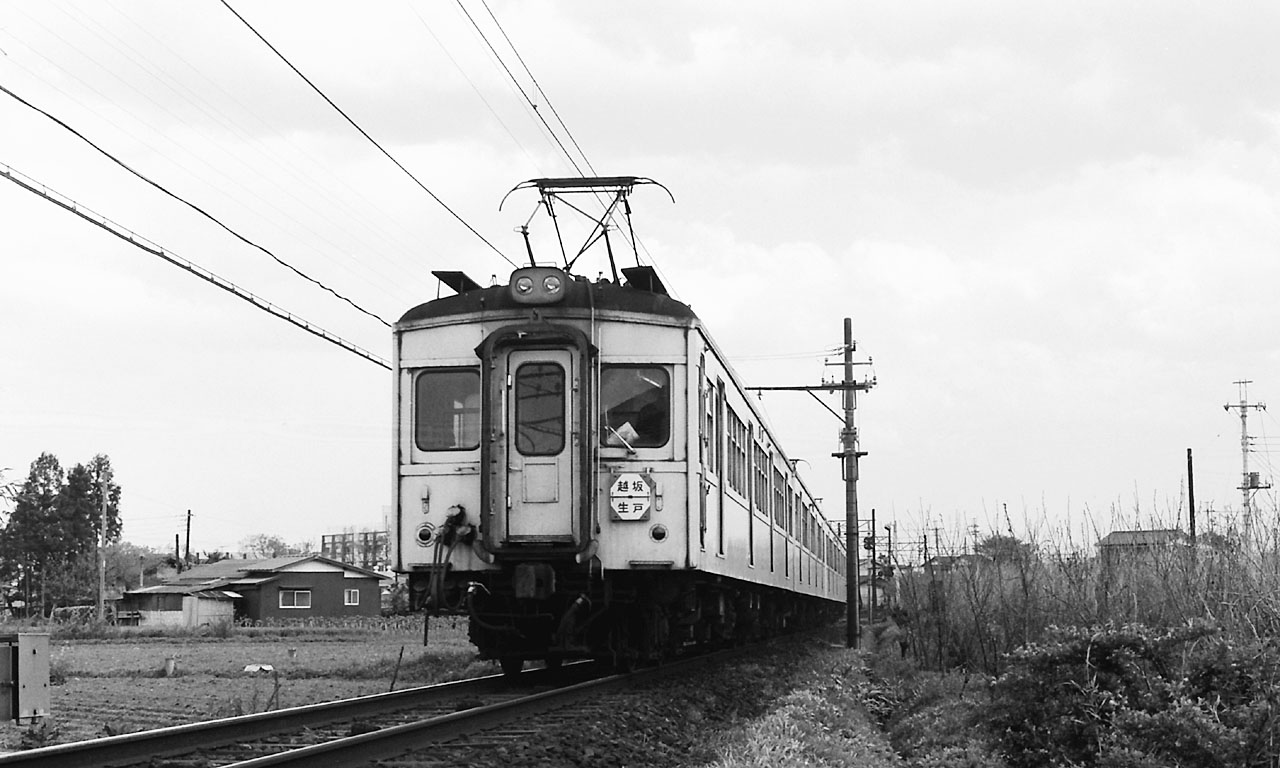
7800 series EMU in April 1977

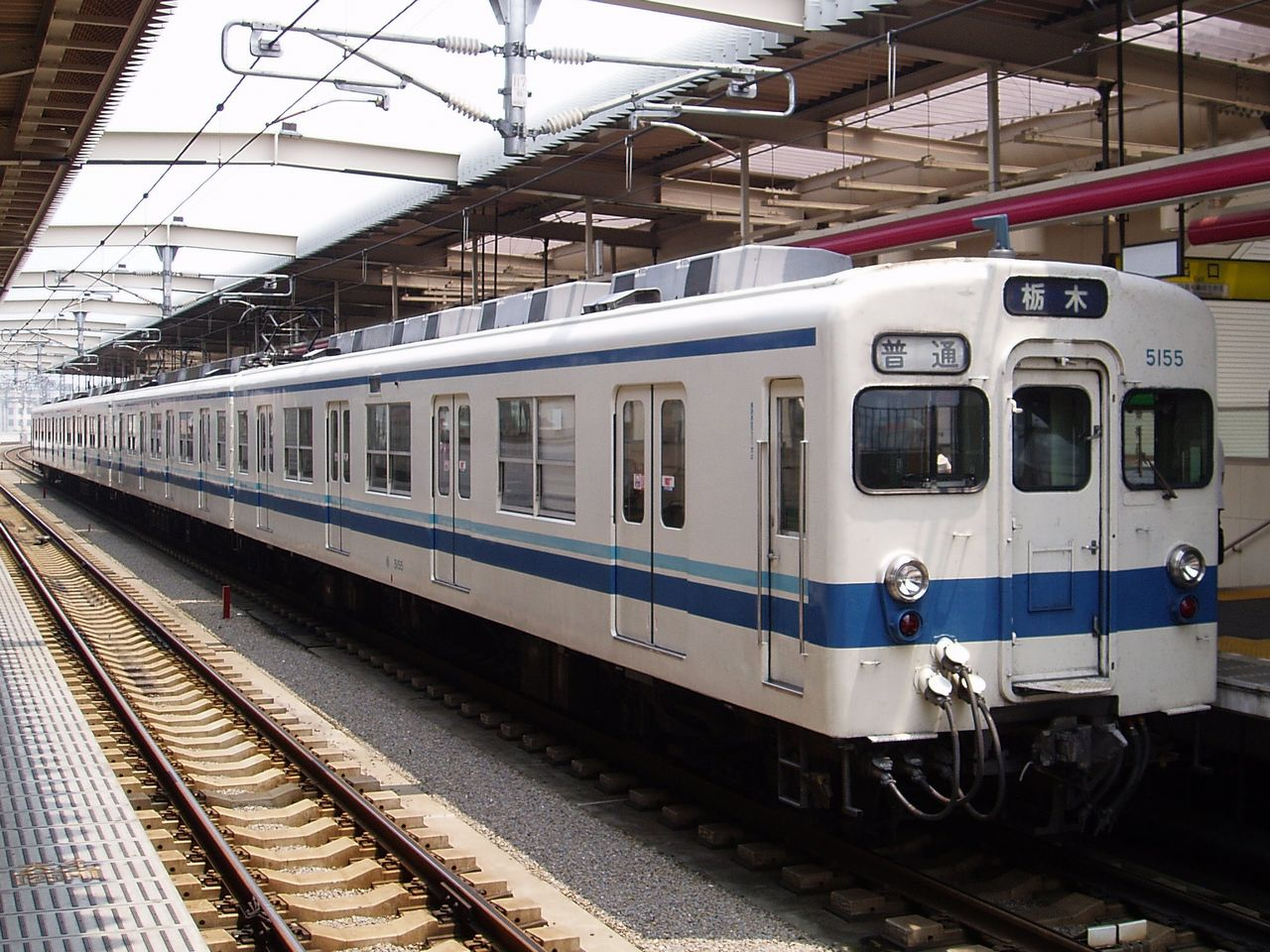
5000 series EMU

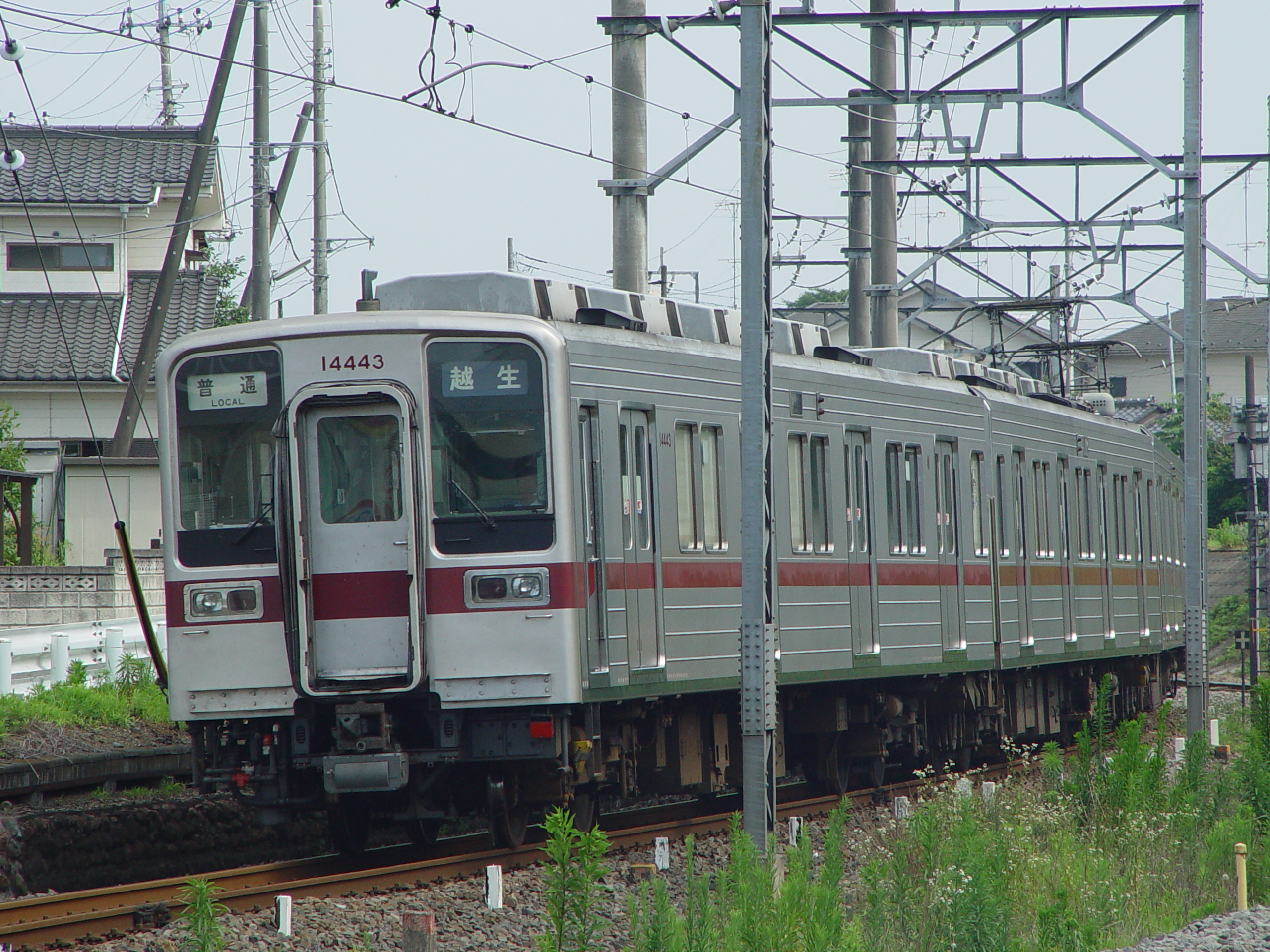
A 10030 series 4-car EMU in July 2004

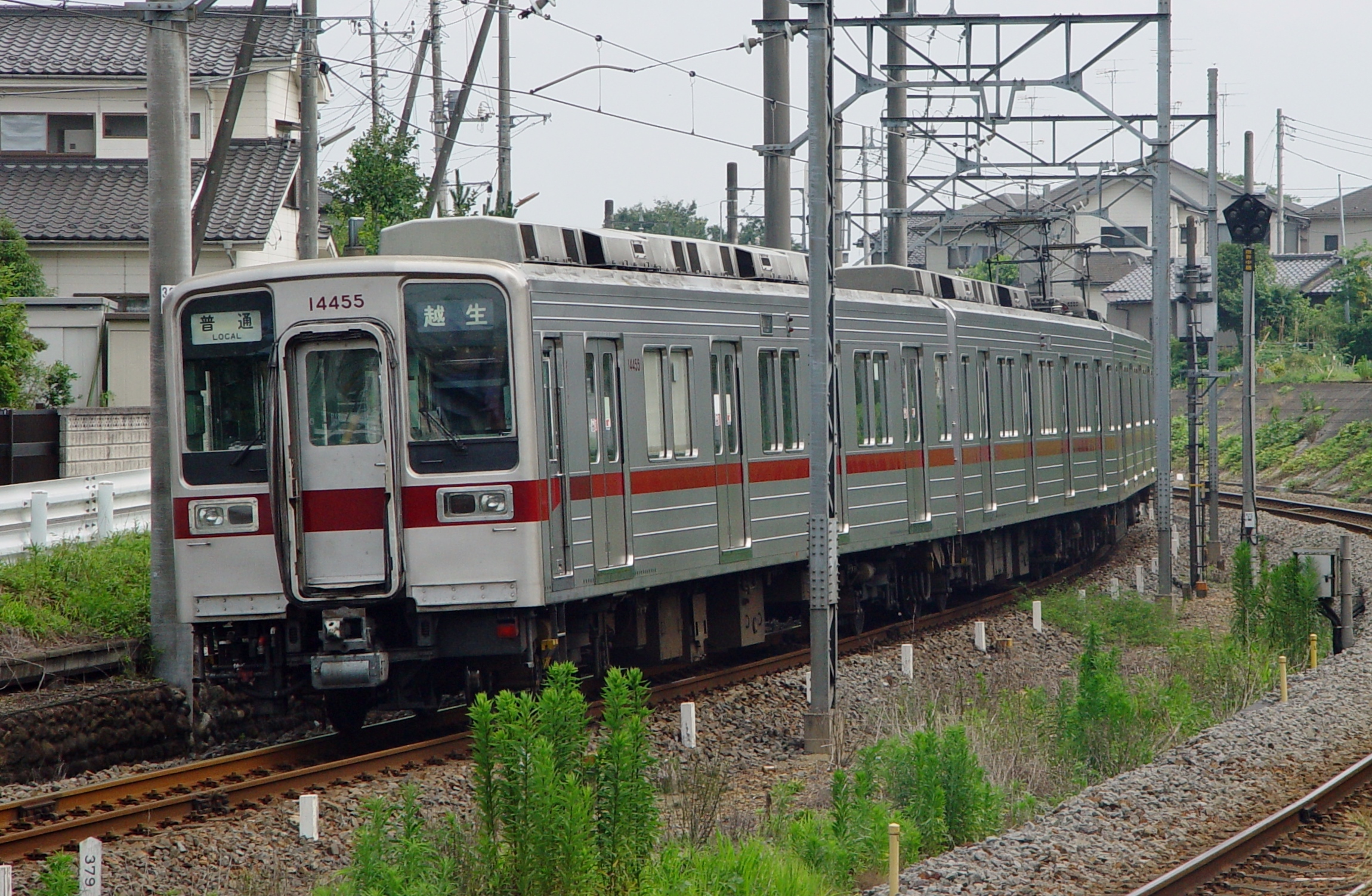
A 10050 series 4-car EMU in July 2004

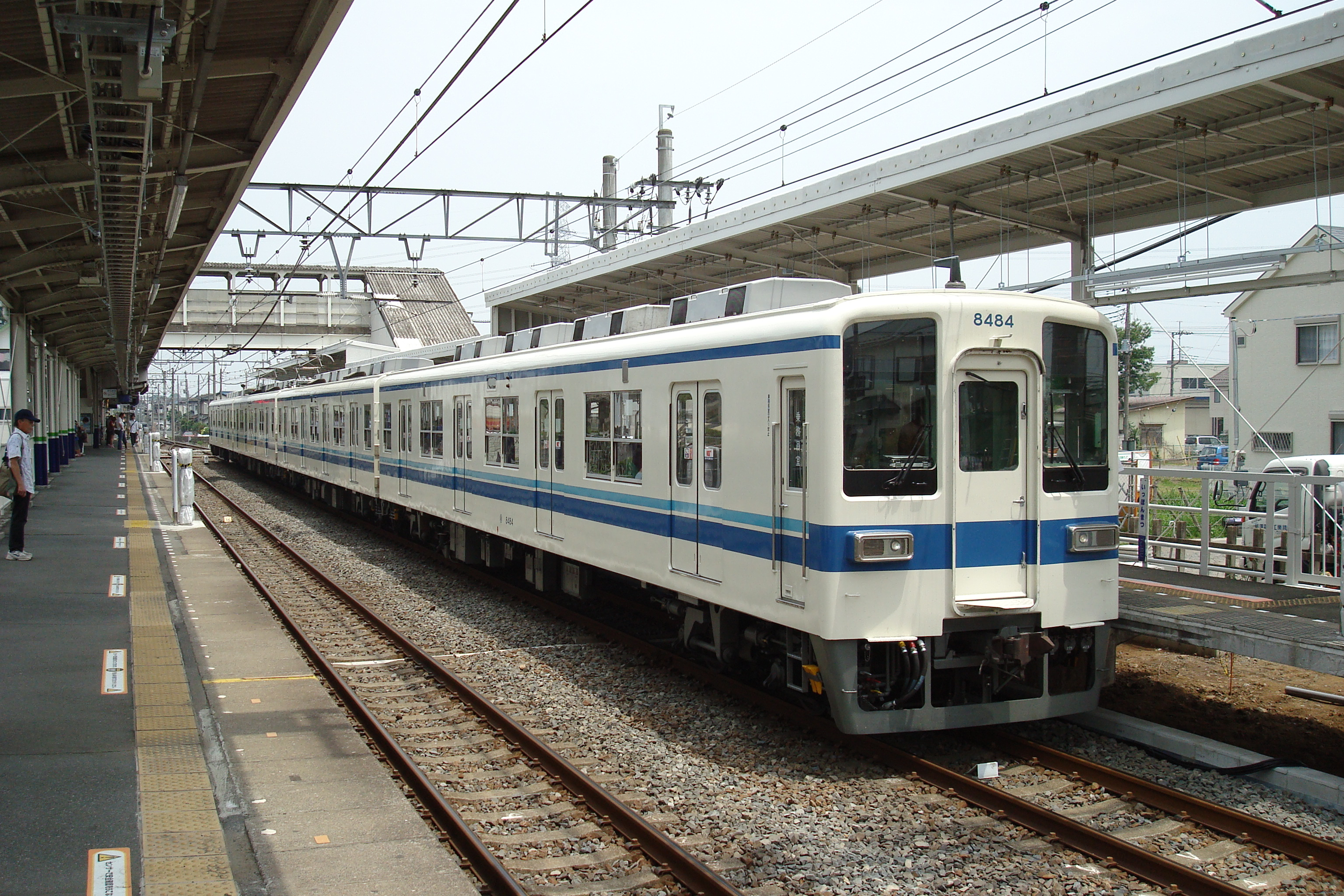
Refurbished 4-car 8000 series set in May 2008

== History ==
The line first opened as a freight line operated by the Ogose Railway (越生鉄道) between Sakado and the Komagawa River (later Morido Station (森戸駅)) on 17 February 1932. The line was extended from Morido to Ogose on 16 December 1934, from which date passenger services also commenced.

From 1 July 1943, the Ogose Railway was absorbed into the Tobu Railway, and the line was renamed the Tobu Ogose Line. From 1 December 1944, all services on the line were suspended, as the line was considered non-essential as part of the war effort. Services were not resumed until 1 December 1945.

The line was electrified in July 1950 at 1,500 V DC. CTC signalling was commissioned on 1 October 1959, the first use of this system by the Tobu company. Freight services between Nishi-Oya and Ogose ceased on 21 February 1984, and between Sakado and Nishi-Oya on 1 August 1984. On 25 August 1987, the Bushu-Nagase to Higashi-Moro section was double-tracked.

Through trains to and from Ikebukuro and Kawagoeshi on the Tojo Line operated until the 1970s. Between 1996 and 2003, a special direct Ogose Kanbai (越生観梅号) train was operated between Ikebukuro and Ogose on certain weekends in February during the plum blossom viewing season. This train initially ran non-stop from Ikebukuro to Ogose (with a driver change at Sakado), but, in subsequent years, included stops at Asakadai and Kawagoe. From 2004 until 2007, regular scheduled trains on the Ogose Line were decorated with an Ogose Kanbai headboard for one day during March.

The Ogose Line switched to driver-only operation from the start of the revised timetable on 14 June 2008. The start of driver-only operation also involved the installation of platform edge sensors at all stations on the Ogose Line.

From 17 March 2012, station numbering was introduced on all Tobu lines. Tobu Tojo Line and Ogose Line stations were numbered prefixed with the letters "TJ".

=== Former connecting lines ===
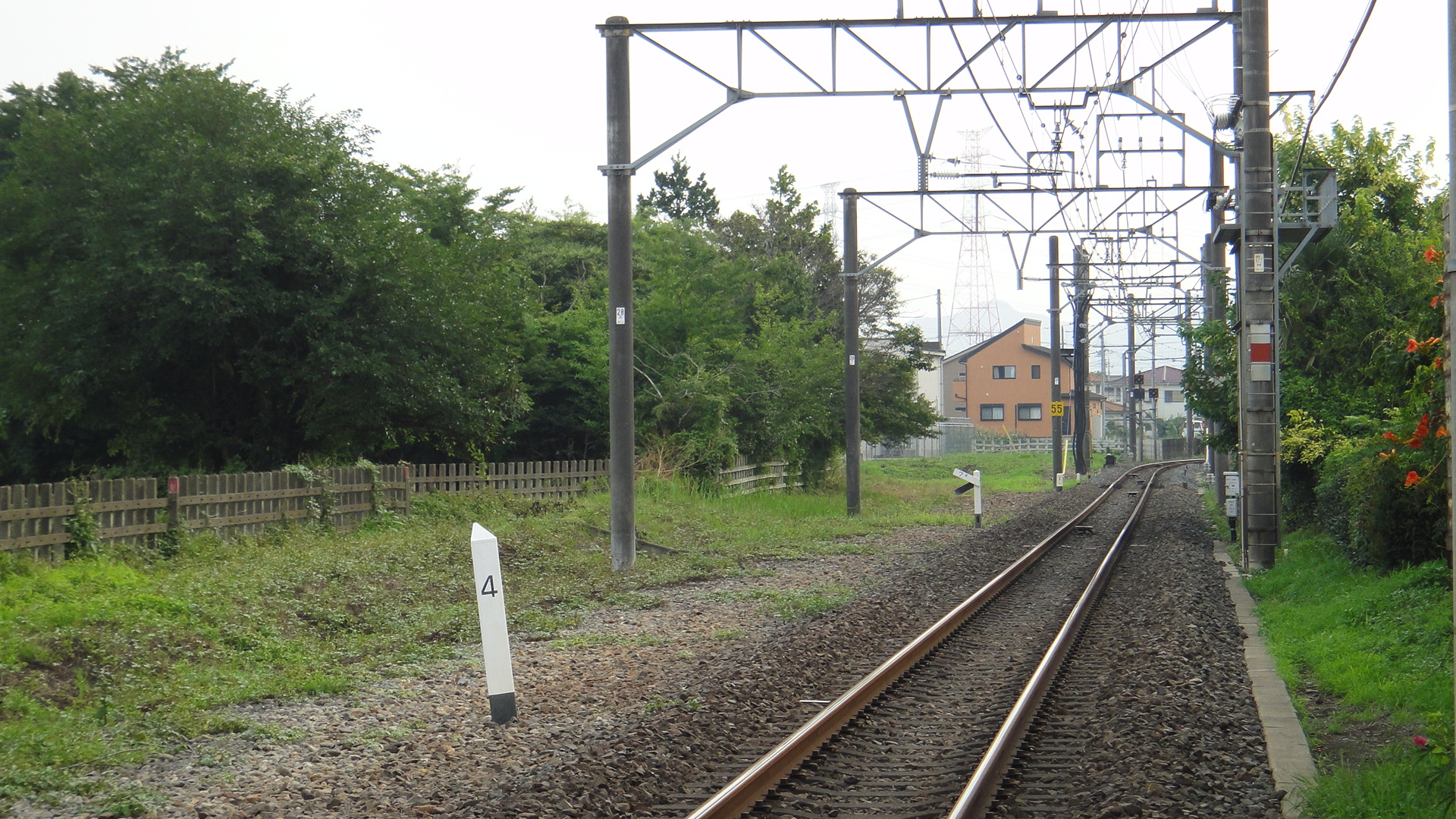
Site of the former Nishi-Oya Junction, with the trackbed of the former freight spur branching off to the left, July 2013

A freight-only line serving the Nippon Cement works in Hidaka operated from 1963 until 1984, using a spur track which branched off from the line at Nishi-Ōya Junction, to the east of Nishi-Ōya Station.

== See also ==
- List of railway lines in Japan
