= Higashi-Moro Station =

Railway station in Moroyama, Saitama Prefecture, Japan

TJ45 Higashi-Moro Station 東毛呂駅
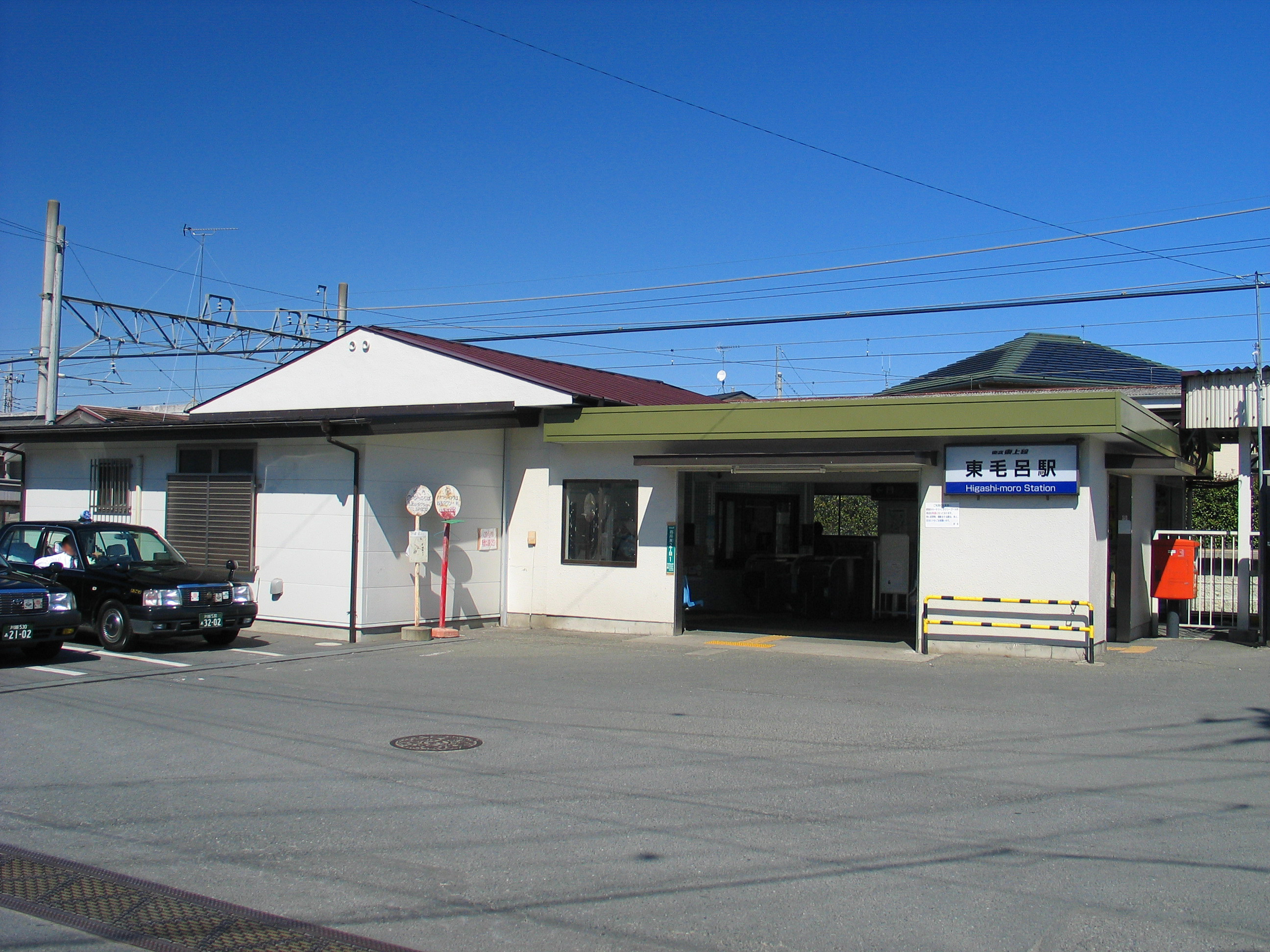
- Higashi-Moro Station entrance in March 2012

General information
- Location: 2314-1 Iwai, Moroyama-machi, Iruma-gun, Saitama-ken 350-0467 350-0467; Japan
- Coordinates: 35.9472°N 139.3152°E
- Operator: Tobu Railway
- Line: Tobu Ogose Line
- Distance: 8.6 km from Sakado
- Platforms: 1 island platform
- Tracks: 2
- Connections: Bus stop

Other information
- Station code: TJ-45
- Website: Official website

History
- Opened: 16 December 1934

Passengers
- FY2019: 5,637 daily

Services
Preceding station	Tobu Railway	Following station
Bushū-Karasawa TJ46 towards Ogose	Ogose Line	Bushū-Nagase TJ44 towards Sakado
Location
- Location within Saitama Prefecture Location within Japan

Higashi-Moro Station (東毛呂駅, Higashi-Moro-eki) is a passenger railway station located in the town of Moroyama, Saitama, Japan, operated by the private railway operator Tōbu Railway.

== Lines ==
Higashi-Moro Station is served by the Tōbu Ogose Line, a 10.9 km single-track branchline running from Sakado to Ogose, and is situated 8.6 km from Sakado. During the daytime, the station is served by four trains per hour in each direction.

== Station layout ==
The station consists of an island platform serving two tracks. The station entrance is on the south side of the station, connected to the platforms by a footbridge at the east (Sakado) end of the platform. A footbridge served by lifts opened at the west (Ogose) end of the platform in 2009.

=== Platforms ===
1	■ Tōbu Ogose Line	for Ogose
2	■ Tōbu Ogose Line	for Sakado

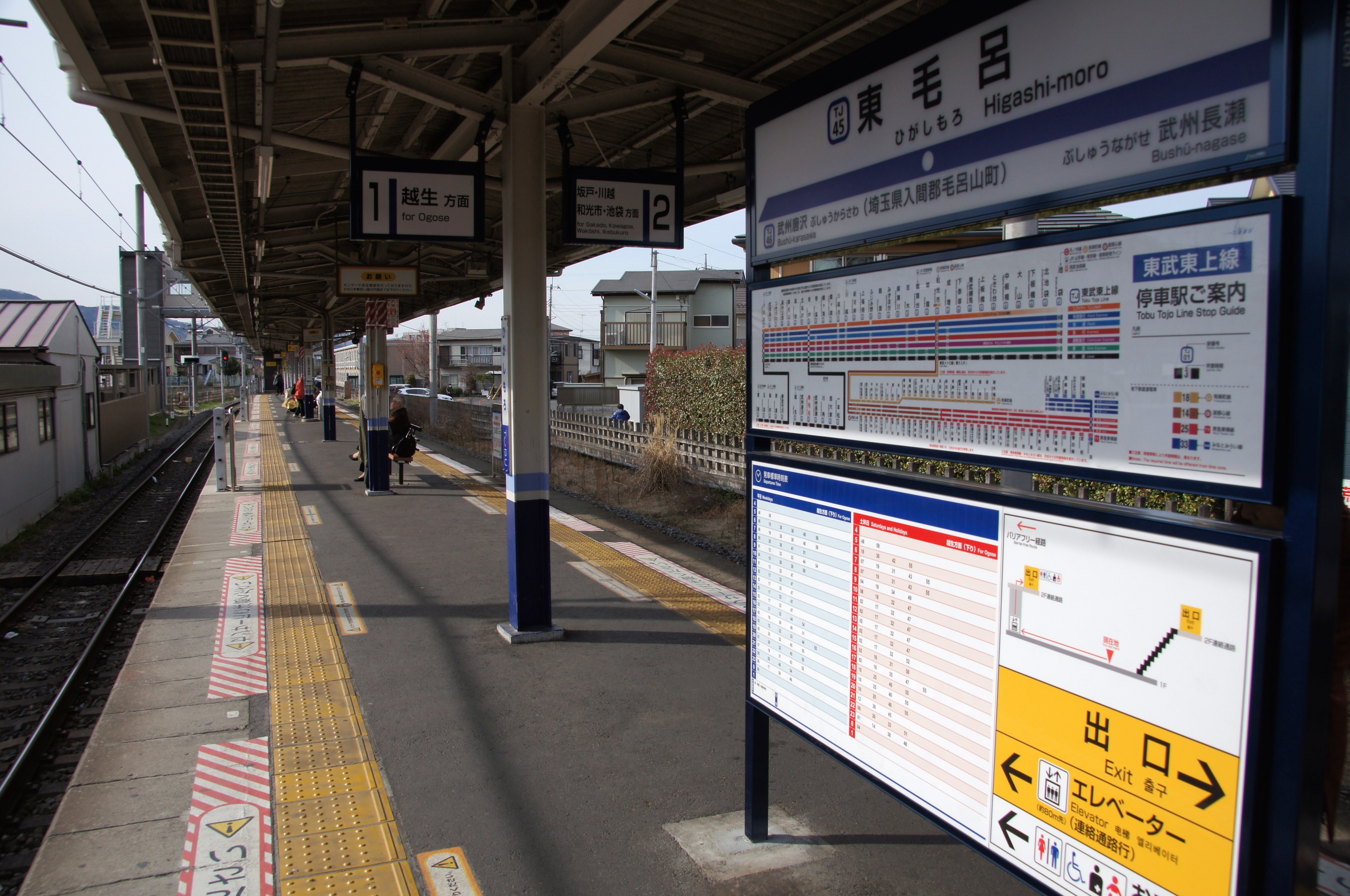
View of the platforms looking west in March 2013

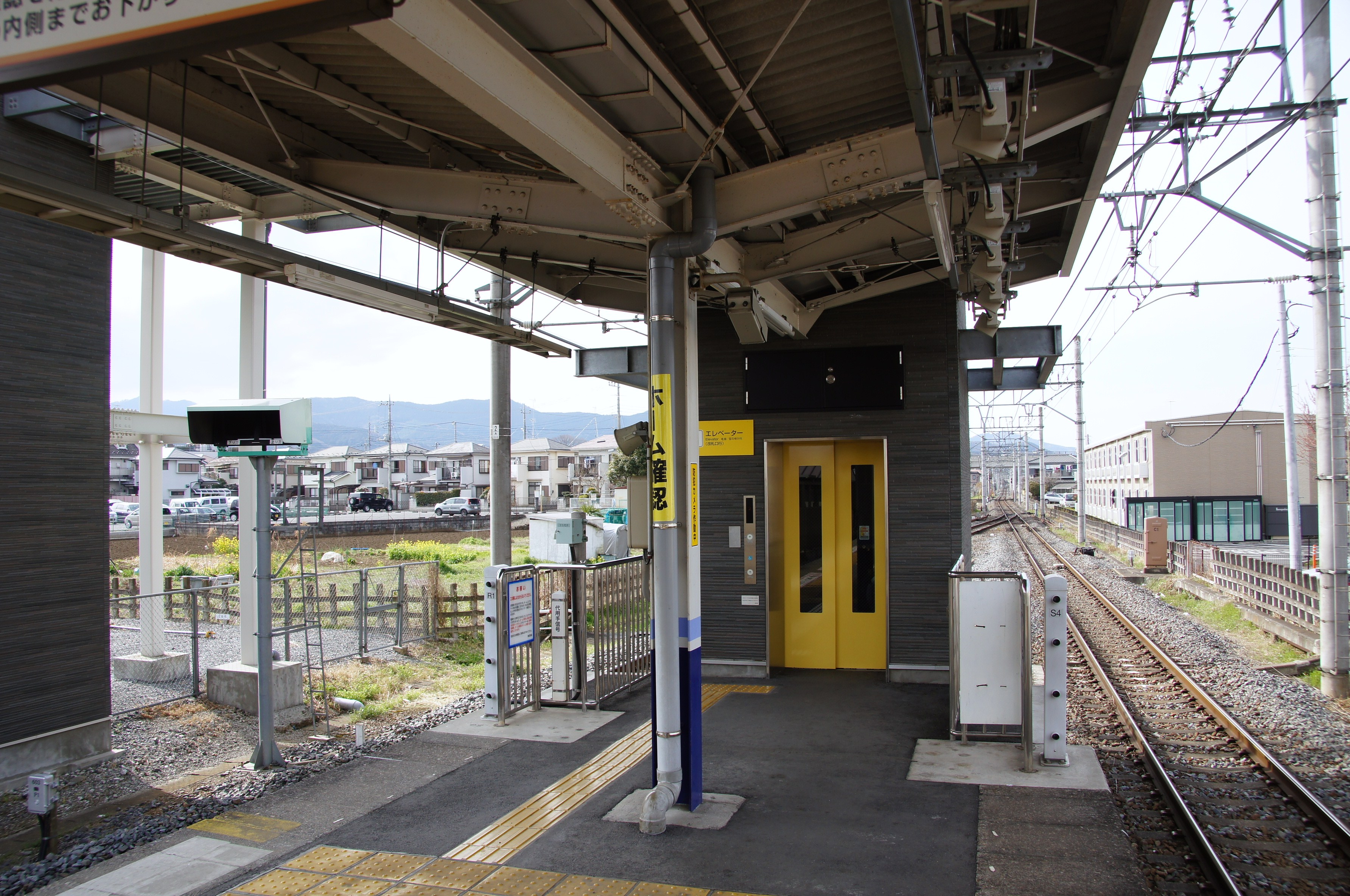
The passenger lift at the Ogose end of the platform in March 2013

== History ==
The station opened on 16 December 1934.

Platform edge sensors and TV monitors were installed in 2008 ahead of the start of driver-only operation on the Ogose Line from June 2008.

From 17 March 2012, station numbering was introduced on the Tōbu Ogose Line, with Higashi-Moro Station becoming "TJ-45".

== Passenger statistics ==
In fiscal 2019, the station was used by an average of 5,637 passengers daily.

== Surrounding area ==
- Moro Station (Hachikō Line) (approximately 15 minutes' walk away)
- Saitama Medical School Moroyama Campus

== Bus services ==
Higashi-Moro Station is served by local Kawagoe Motor Corporation (KKJ) bus services from a bus stop in front of the station. It is also served by the "Moro Bus" community minibus (Yabusame Green Line and Yuzu Yellow Line) service.

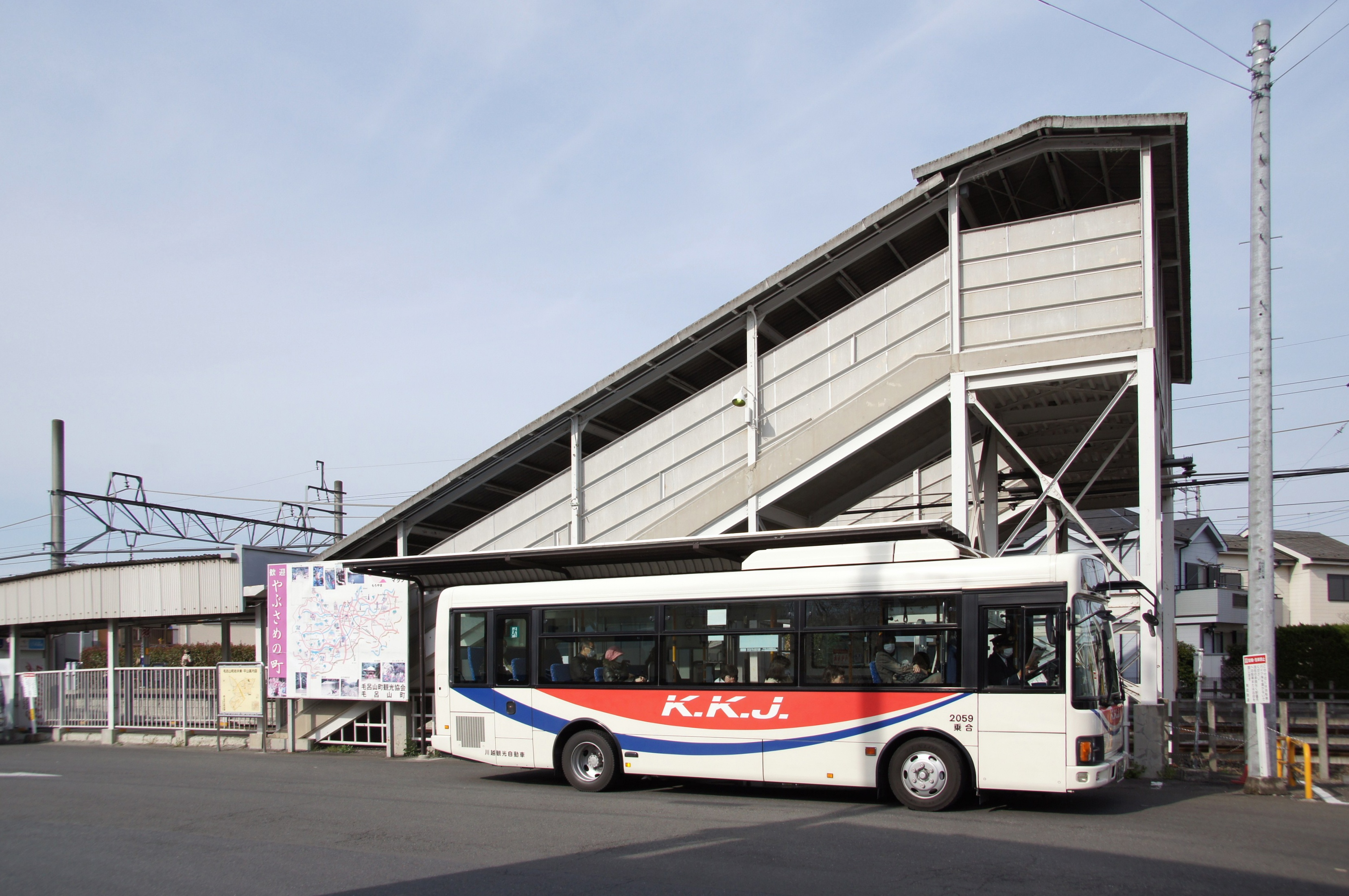
A KKJ bus at the bus stop in front of Higashi-Moro Station in March 2013

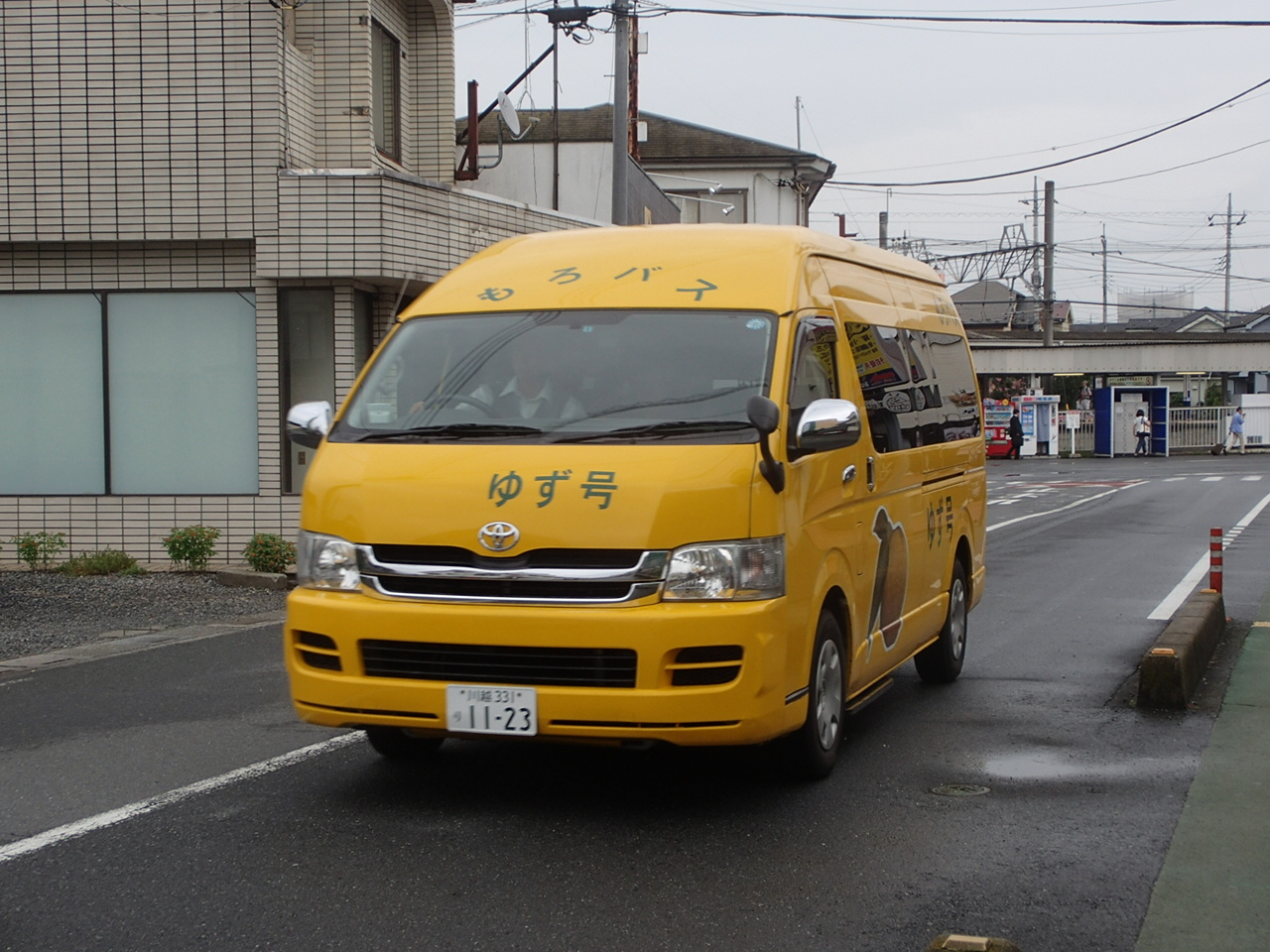
A "Moro Bus" minibus near Higashi-Moro Station in August 2014

== See also ==
- List of railway stations in Japan
