= Bushū-Karasawa Station =

Railway station in Ogose, Saitama Prefecture, Japan

TJ46 Bushū-Karasawa Station 武州唐沢駅
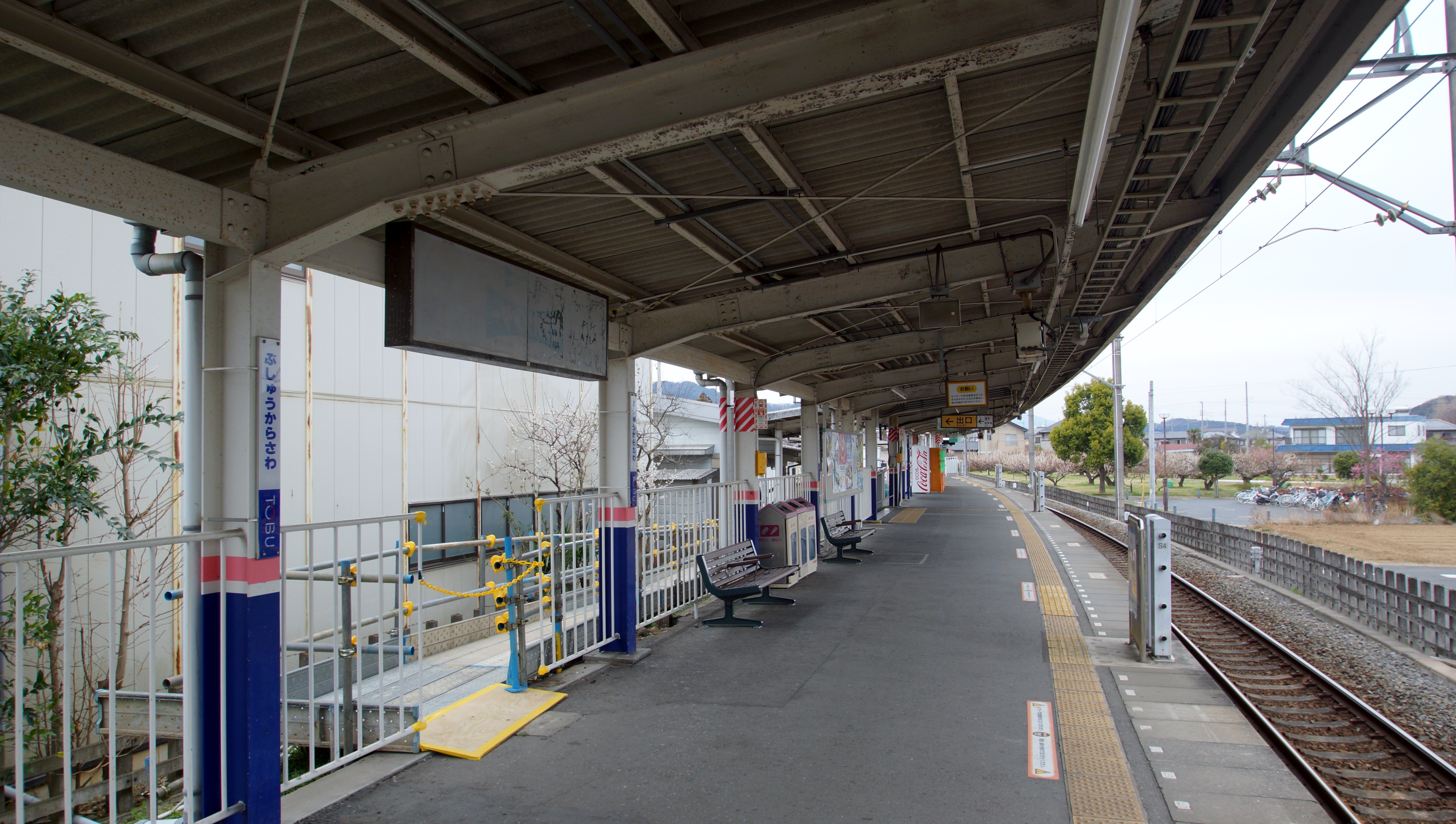
- The station platform in March 2016

General information
- Location: 51-6 Ueno, Ogose-machi, Iruma-gun, Saitama-ken 350–0415; Japan
- Coordinates: 35.9524°N 139.3092°E
- Operator: Tobu Railway
- Line: Tobu Ogose Line
- Distance: 9.4 km from Sakado
- Platforms: 1 side platform
- Tracks: 1

Other information
- Station code: TJ-46
- Website: Official website

History
- Opened: 16 December 1934

Passengers
- FY2019: 2,978 daily

Services
Preceding station	Tobu Railway	Following station
Ogose TJ47 Terminus	Ogose Line	Higashi-Moro TJ45 towards Sakado
Location
- Location within Saitama Prefecture Location within Japan

Bushū-Karasawa Station (武州唐沢駅, Bushū Karasawa-eki) is a passenger railway station located in the town of Ogose, Saitama, Japan, operated by the private railway operator Tōbu Railway.

== Lines ==
Bushū-Karasawa Station is served by the Tōbu Ogose Line, a 10.9 km single-track branchline running from Sakado to Ogose, and is situated 9.4 km from Sakado. During the daytime, the station is served by four trains per hour in each direction.

== Station layout ==
The station consists of a single un-numbered four-car-long side platform serving a bi-directional track.

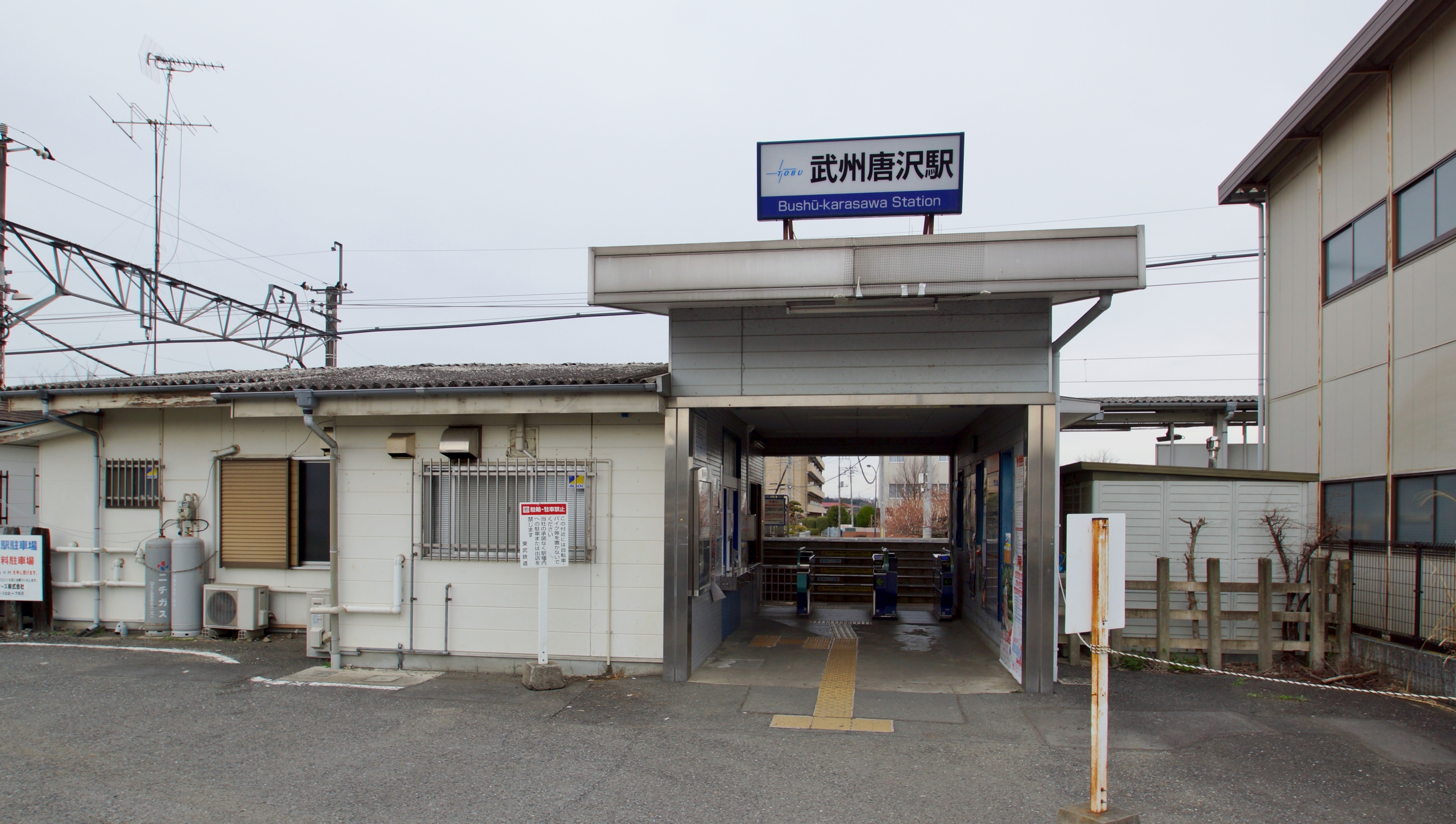
Bushū-Karasawa Station entrance in March 2016

== History ==
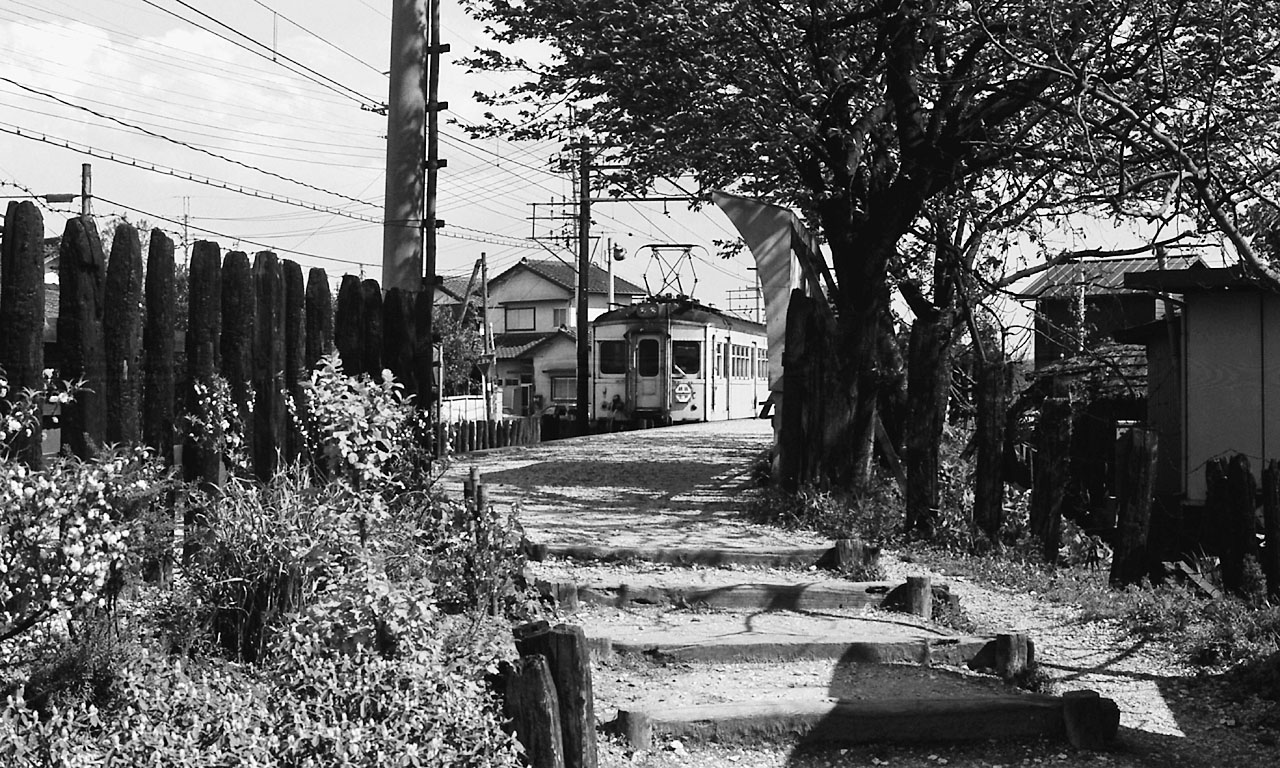
Bushu-Karasawa Station in April 1977, with a 7800 series EMU visible

The station opened on 16 December 1934.

Platform edge sensors and TV monitors were installed in 2008 ahead of the start of driver-only operation on the Ogose Line from June 2008.

From 17 March 2012, station numbering was introduced on the Tōbu Ogose Line, with Bushū-Karasawa Station becoming "TJ-46".

== Passenger statistics ==
In fiscal 2019, the station was used by an average of 2,978 passengers daily.

Fiscal year	Daily average
2010	2,684
2011	2,701
2012	2,767
2013	2,744
2014	2,552

== Surrounding area ==
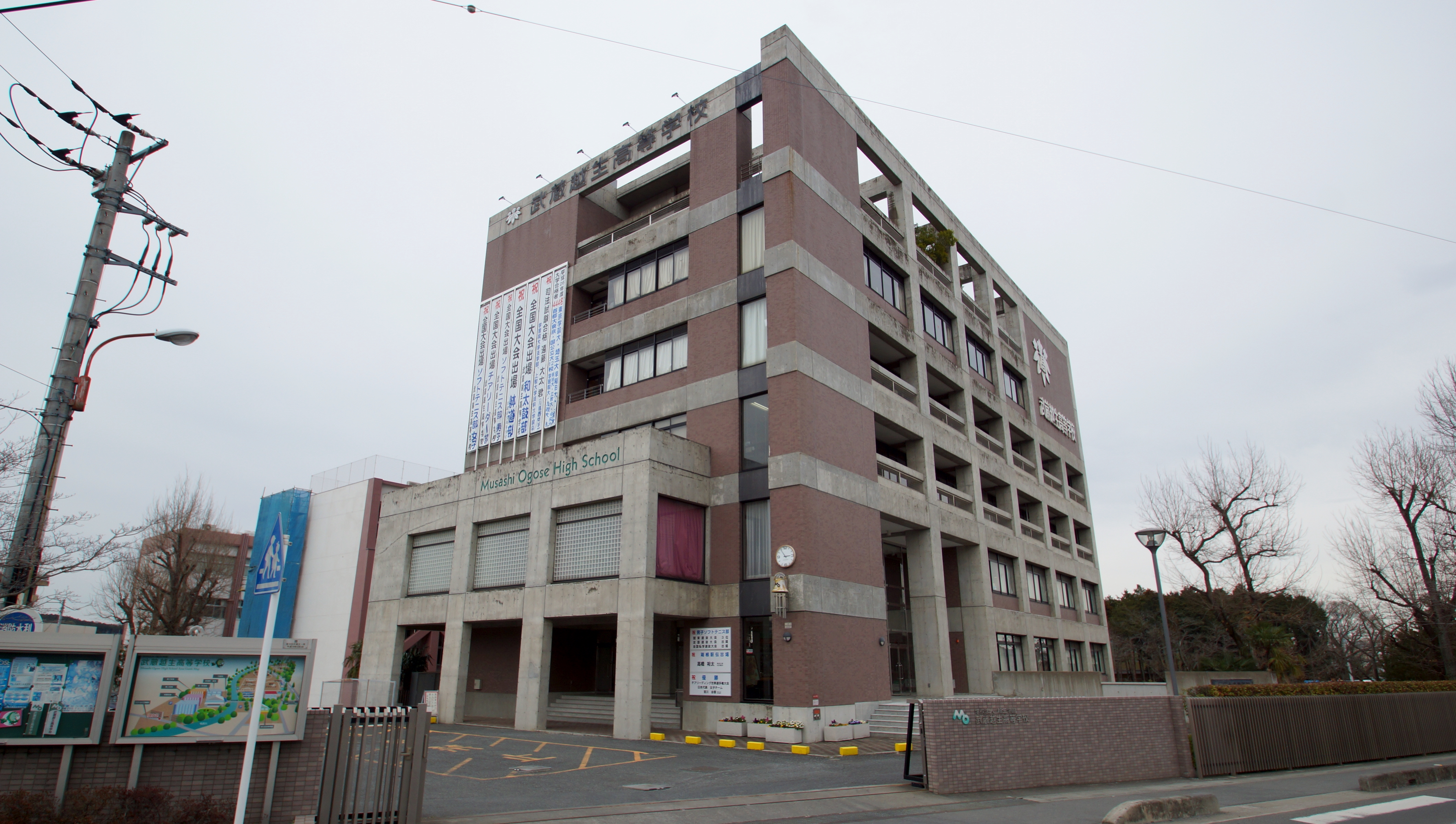
Musashi Ogose High School in March 2016

- Ogose Automobile College
- Musashi Ogose High School
- Seiwa Gakuen High School

== See also ==
- List of railway stations in Japan
