= Ogose =

Ogose 越生町
- Town
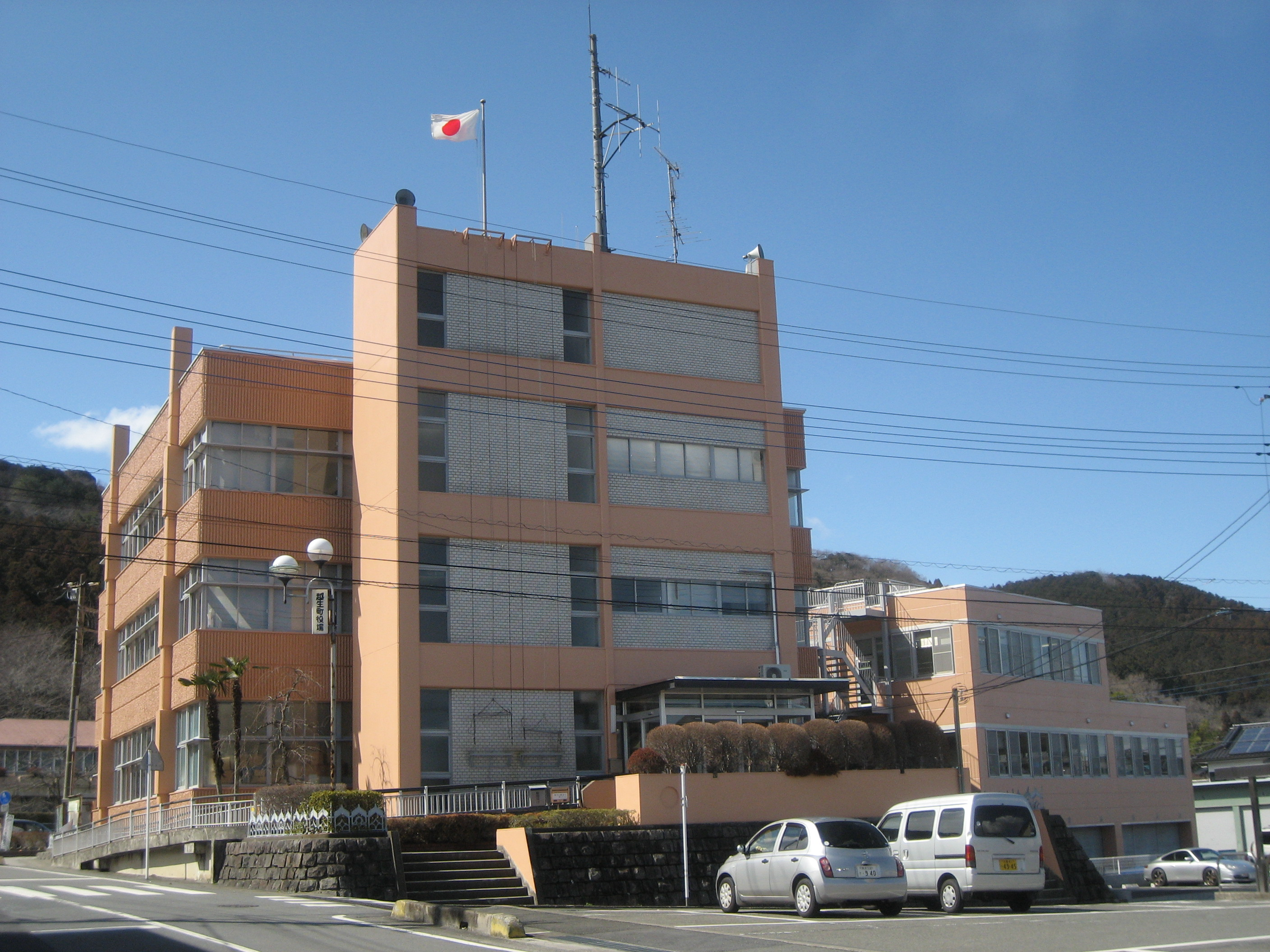
- Ogose town office

- Flag Seal

- Location of Ogose in Saitama Prefecture

- Coordinates: 35°57′52.2″N 139°17′39.1″E
- Country: Japan
- Region: Kantō
- Prefecture: Saitama
- District: Iruma

Area
  - Total: 40.39 km^{2} (15.59 sq mi)

Population (January 2021)
  - Total: 11,352
  - Density: 281.1/km^{2} (727.9/sq mi)
- Time zone: UTC+9 (Japan Standard Time)
- Tree: Prunus mume
- Flower: Kerria japonica
- Bird: Japanese bush warbler
- Phone number: 049-292-3121
- Address: 900-2 Ogose, Ogose-machi, Iruma-gun, Saitama-ken 350-0494
- Website: Official website

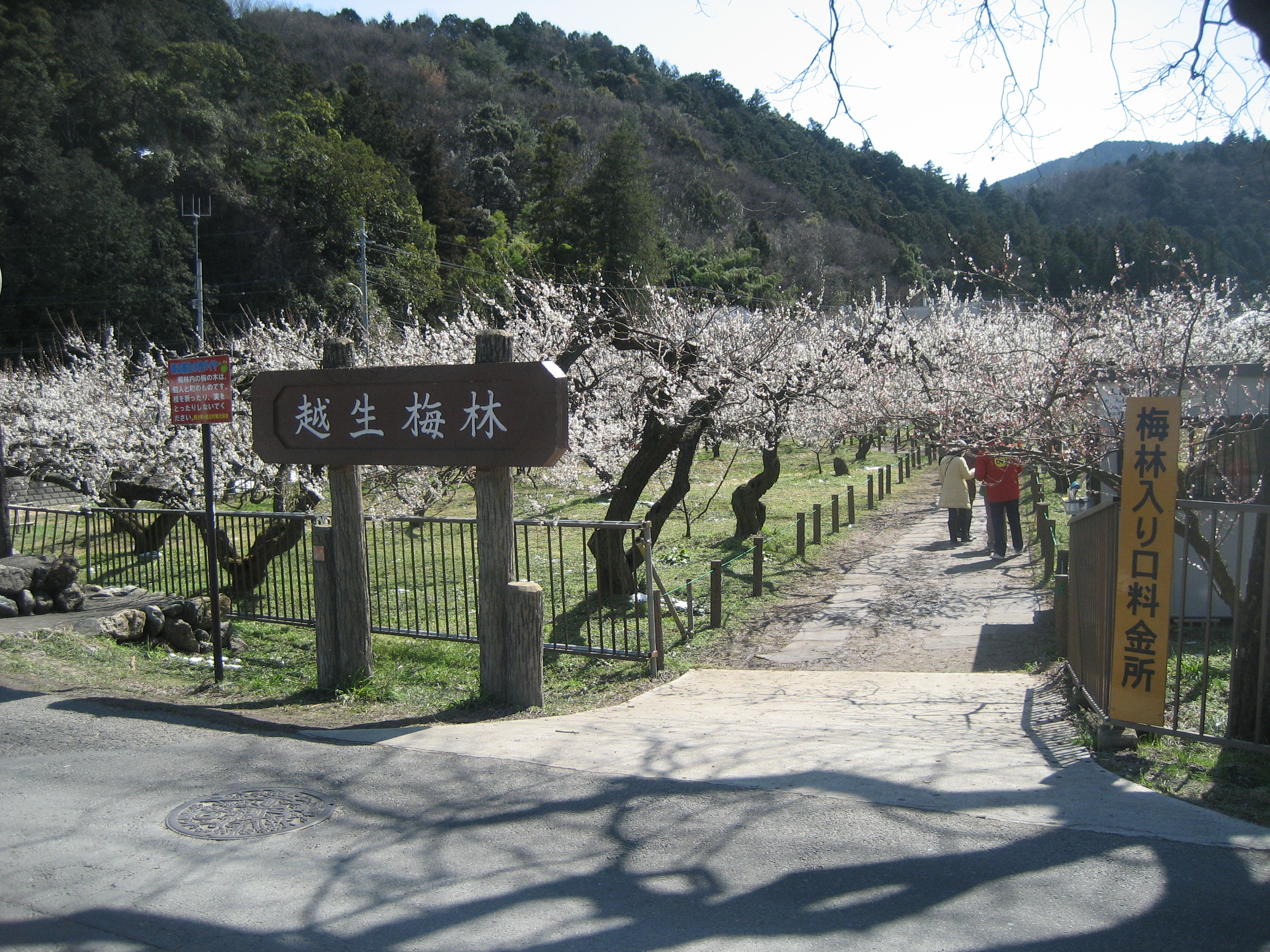
Ogose Bairin

Ogose (越生町, Ogose-machi) is a town located in Saitama Prefecture, Japan. As of 1 January 2021, the town had an estimated population of 11,352 in 5038 households and a population density of 280 persons per km^{2}. The total area of the town is 40.39 square kilometres (15.59 sq mi). The town is famous for its Prunus mume orchards.

== Geography ==
Ogose is located in central Saitama Prefecture, approximately 50 kilometers from downtown Tokyo.

=== Surrounding municipalities ===
Saitama Prefecture

- Hannō
- Hatoyama
- Moroyama
- Tokigawa

=== Climate ===
Ogose has a humid subtropical climate (Köppen Cfa) characterized by warm summers and cool winters with light to no snowfall. The average annual temperature in Ogose is 13.8 °C. The average annual rainfall is 1746 mm with September as the wettest month. The temperatures are highest on average in August, at around 25.4 °C, and lowest in January, at around 2.3 °C.

== Demographics ==
Per Japanese census data, the population of Ogose peaked around the year 2000 and has declined since.

Historical population
Year	Pop.	±%
1920	8,194	—
1930	8,219	+0.3%
1940	7,881	−4.1%
1950	10,061	+27.7%
1960	9,956	−1.0%
1970	10,147	+1.9%
1980	11,361	+12.0%
1990	11,947	+5.2%
2000	13,718	+14.8%
2010	12,537	−8.6%
2020	11,029	−12.0%

== History ==
Ogose town was created within Iruma District, Saitama with the establishment of the modern municipalities system on April 1, 1889. Ogose annexed neighboring Umezono village on February 1, 1955.

== Government ==
Ogose has a mayor-council form of government with a directly elected mayor and a unicameral town council of 12 members. Ogose, together with the towns of Hatoyama and Moroyama, contributes one member to the Saitama Prefectural Assembly. In terms of national politics, the town is part of Saitama 9th district of the lower house of the Diet of Japan.

== Economy ==
Ogose remains largely an agricultural town, primarily based on horticulture, although it has increasingly become a bedroom community.

== Education ==
- Ogose has two public elementary schools and one public middle school operated by the town government, and one public high school operated by the Saitama Prefectural Board of Education. In addition, there are two private high schools.

== Transportation ==
=== Railway ===
JR East – Hachikō Line

- Ogose

Tōbu Railway - Tōbu Ogose Line

- Ogose - Bushū-Karasawa

=== Highway ===
Ogose is not served by any expressways or national highways

== Local attractions ==
- Kuroyama waterfalls
- Ogose Plum Gardens

== Noted people from Ogose ==
- Yusuke Shimada, professional football player
