= Kawakado Station =

Railway station in Moroyama, Saitama Prefecture, Japan

TJ43 Kawakado Station 川角駅
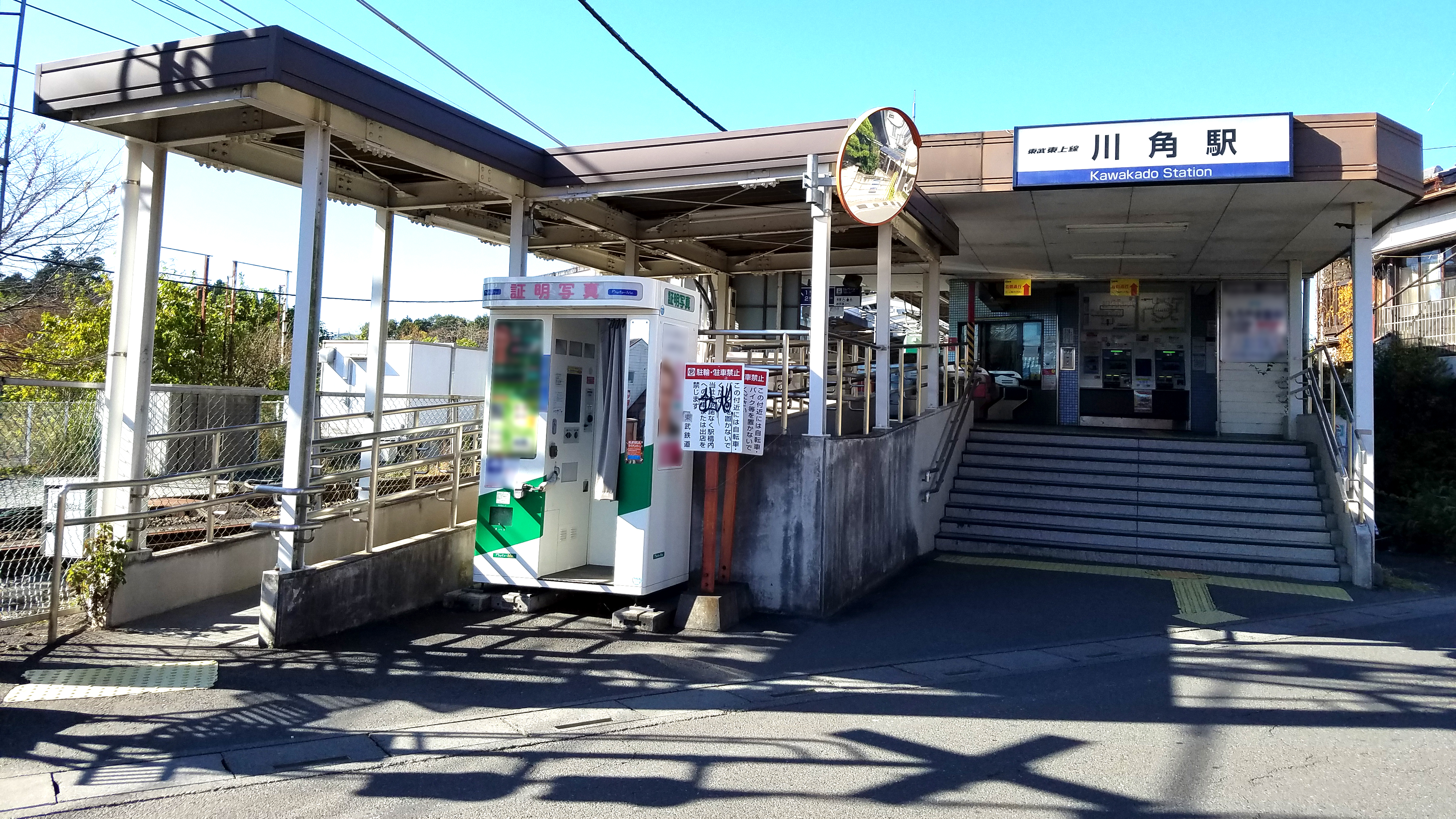
- Kawakado Station entrance in November 2020

General information
- Location: 289-2 Shimogawara, Moroyama-machi, Iruma-gun, Saitama-ken 350–0435; Japan
- Coordinates: 35.9377°N 139.3465°E
- Operator: Tōbu Railway
- Line: Tōbu Ogose Line
- Distance: 5.6 km from Sakado
- Platforms: 2 side platforms
- Tracks: 2
- Connections: Bus stop

Other information
- Station code: TJ-43
- Website: Official website

History
- Opened: 16 December 1934

Passengers
- FY2019: 15,584 daily

Services
Preceding station	Tobu Railway	Following station
Bushū-Nagase TJ44 towards Ogose	Ogose Line	Nishi-Ōya TJ42 towards Sakado
Location
- Location within Saitama Prefecture Location within Japan

Kawakado Station (川角駅, Kawakado-eki) is a passenger railway station located in the town of Moroyama, Saitama, Japan, operated by the private railway operator Tōbu Railway.

== Lines ==
Kawakado Station is served by the Tōbu Ogose Line, a 10.9 km single-track branchline running from Sakado to Ogose, and is situated 5.6 km from Sakado. During the daytime, the station is served by four trains per hour in each direction.

== Station layout ==
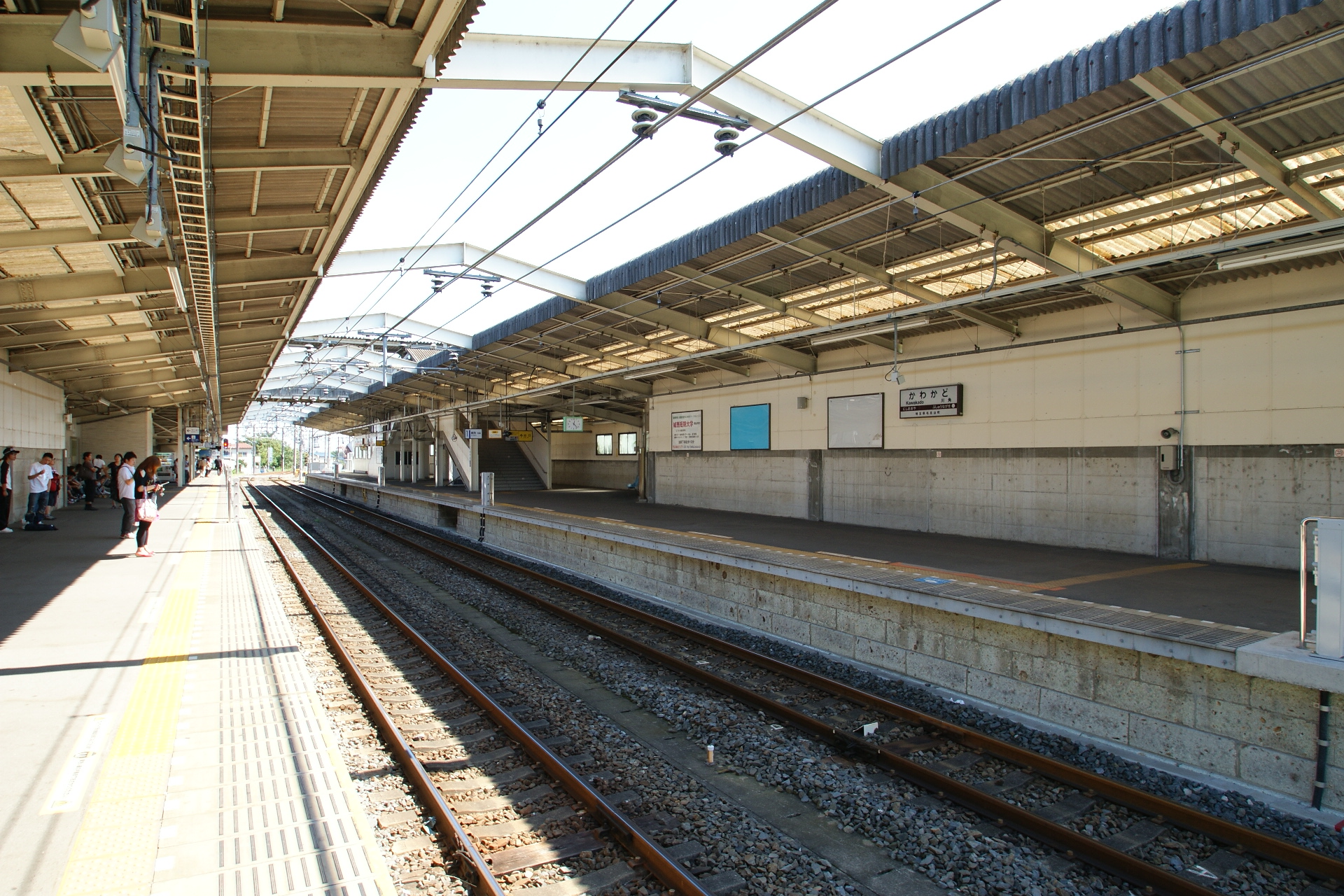
View looking east from the up (Sakado-bound) platform in September 2009

The station consists of two side platforms serving two tracks forming a passing loop on the single-track line. The station entrance is located on the northern (Sakado-bound) side of the station. Lifts were added in 2009.

=== Platforms ===
1	■ Tōbu Ogose Line	for Ogose
2	■ Tōbu Ogose Line	for Sakado

== History ==
The station opened on 16 December 1934, initially as an unstaffed station. It became a staffed station on 17 May 1965. A second platform and passing loop was added in August 1987.

Platform edge sensors and TV monitors were installed in 2008 ahead of the start of driver-only operation on the Ogose Line from June 2008.

From 17 March 2012, station numbering was introduced on the Tōbu Ogose Line, with Kawakado Station becoming "TJ-43".

== Passenger statistics ==
In fiscal 2019, the station was used by an average of 14,584 passengers daily.

== Surrounding area ==
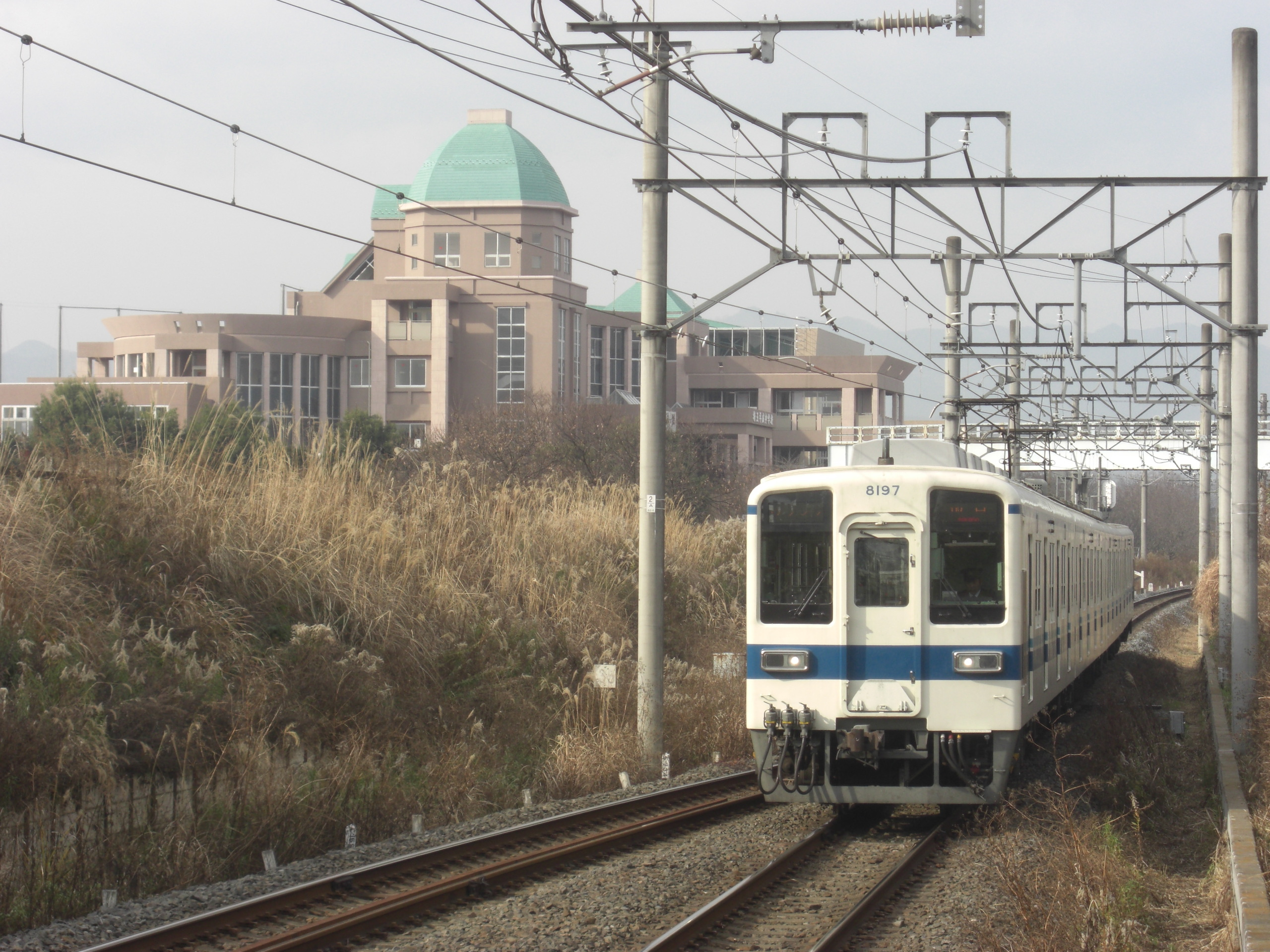
Ogose Line 8000 series train approaching Kawakado Station on a Sakado-bound service with Saitama Heisei Junior High School visible in the background, December 2008

The station is close to the campuses of three universities: Josai University, Meikai University (Sakado Campus), and Nihon Institute of Medical Science. The large number of students using the line makes this station the busiest on the Ogose Line second only to Sakado Station. The station is also close to the Saitama Heisei Junior and Senior High Schools.

== Bus services ==
Kawakado Station is served by the "Moro Bus" community minibus (Yuzu Yellow Line) service operated by the town of Moro, and also by the "Sakacchi Bus" (Ōya Line) and "Sakacchi Wagon" (Nissai Line) community minibus services operated by the city of Sakado.

== See also ==
- List of railway stations in Japan
