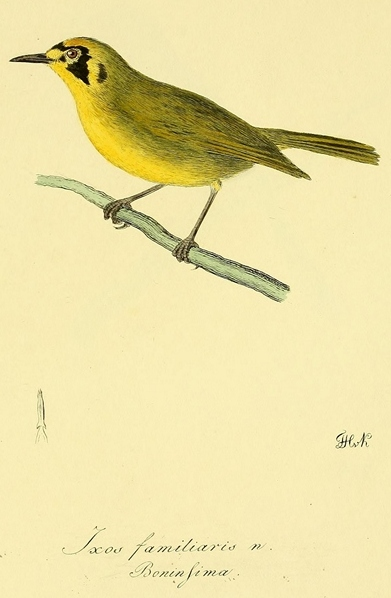

Conservation status
- Extinct (1930s)

Scientific classification
- Kingdom: Animalia
- Phylum: Chordata
- Class: Aves
- Order: Passeriformes
- Family: Zosteropidae
- Genus: Apalopteron
- Species: A. familiare
- Subspecies: †A. f. familiare

Trinomial name
- †Apalopteron familiare familiare (Kittlitz, 1830)

= Mukojima white-eye =

Extinct subspecies of bird

The Mukojima white-eye (Apalopteron familiare familiare), incorrectly known as the Mukojima honeyeater, is the extinct nominate subspecies of the Bonin white-eye (formerly Bonin honeyeater). It occurred on Muko-jima and Nakodo-jima in the northern group of the Ogasawara Islands. The last record were specimens taken in January 1930 on Muko-jima; by then, the bird was already gone from Nakodo-jima. In 1941, the subspecies was found to have gone extinct in the meantime.
