= Yamagishi =

Yamagishi (written: 山岸) is a Japanese surname. Notable people with the surname include:

- Akira Yamagishi (山岸 章; 1929–2016), Japanese trade unionist
- Hidetada Yamagishi (山岸 秀匡; born 1973), Japanese bodybuilder
- Hiroki Yamagishi (山岸 宏貴; born 1991), Japanese long-distance runner
- Isao Yamagishi (山岸 勲; born 1966), Japanese diver
- Jiro Yamagishi (山岸 二郎; 1912–1997), Japanese tennis player
- June Yamagishi (山岸 潤史; born 1953), Japanese guitarist
- Norihiro Yamagishi (山岸 範宏; born 1978), Japanese footballer
- Ryoji Yamagishi (山岸 良二; born 1951), Japanese archaeologist
- Ryoko Yamagishi (山岸 凉子; born 1947), Japanese manga artist
- Satoru Yamagishi (山岸 智; born 1983), Japanese footballer
- Shōji Yamagishi (山岸 章二; 1930–1979), Japanese photo editor and curator

== See also ==
- Yamagishi movement, an egalitarian community
