= Atarashiki-mura =

Atarashiki 新しき村
- Village community
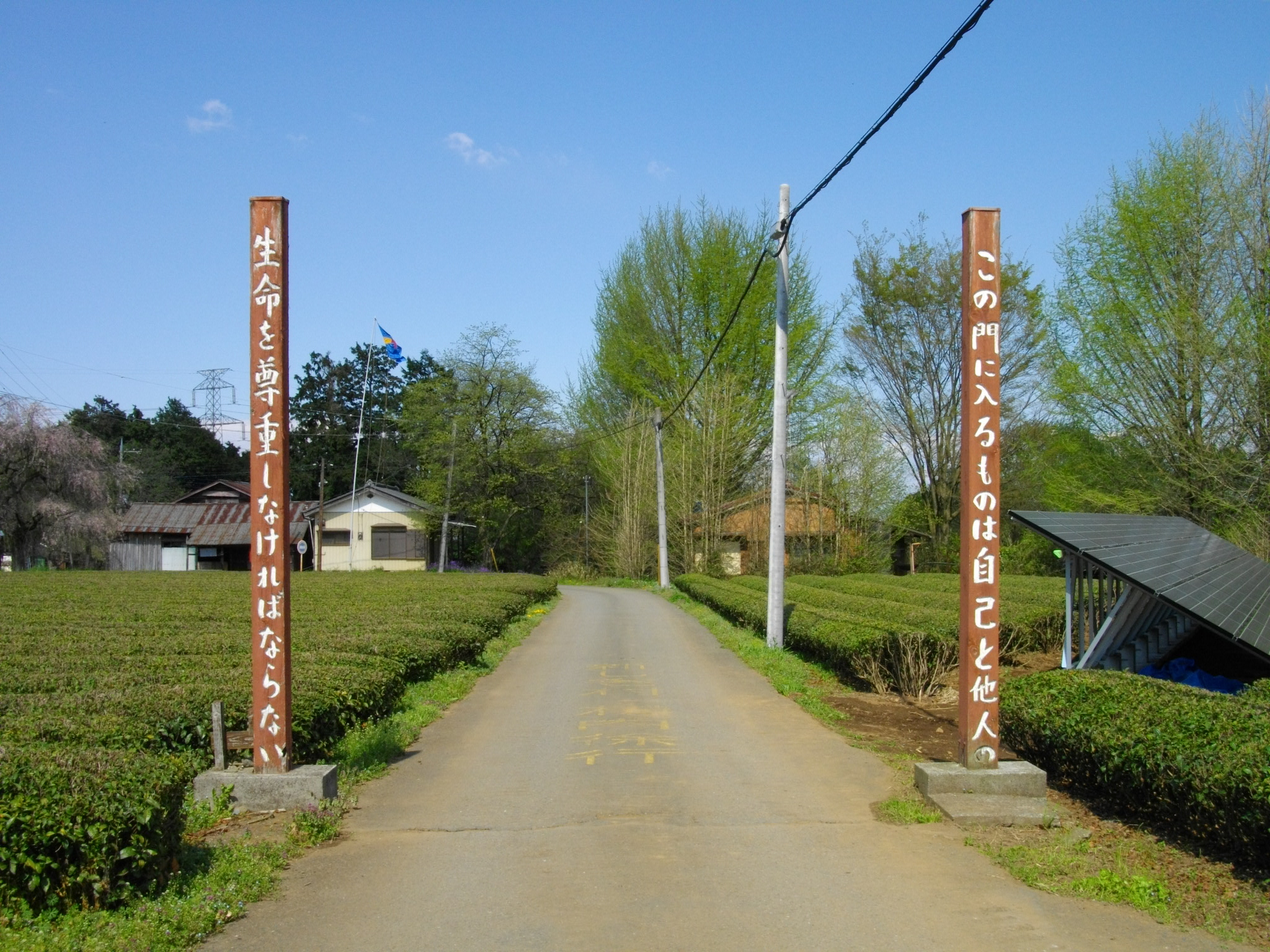
- Entrance to Atarashiki-mura

- Flag

- Coordinates: 35°55′47.3″N 139°19′28.4″E
- Country: Japan
- Region: Kantō
- Prefecture: Saitama
- District: Iruma
- Town: Moroyama

Area
  - Total: 1,030 km^{2} (400 sq mi)

Population (2016)
  - Total: 11
  - Density: 0.011/km^{2} (0.028/sq mi)
- Time zone: UTC+9 (Japan Standard Time)
- Tree: Yuzu
- Flower: Chrysanthemum
- Bird: Japanese white-eye
- Mascot: Moromaru-kun
- Phone number: 049-295-5398
- Address: 423-1, Tsuzuranuki, Moroyama-cho, Iruma-gun, Saitama Prefecture 350-0445
- Website: Official website

Atarashiki-mura (新しき村; lit. 'New Village') is a Japanese utopian community founded by the author, artist and philosopher Saneatsu Mushanokōji, which has been approved as a foundation by the local government after its establishment.

== History ==
The village was founded in 1918 in Hyūga, in the mountains of Miyazaki Prefecture in Kyūshū, but in 1939 they were warned that much of their land was about to be submerged by the construction of a dam, so they searched for a new home and found 10 hectares in Moroyama, Iruma District, Saitama Prefecture. A few members remain at Hyūga to this day, but they are still to a certain extent dependent on the Saitama community and support from "external members". The village's population dropped to just two families during World War II, but many people moved into the Atarashiki-mura after the war. Saitama Prefecture approved the village as a foundation in 1948.

Mushanokōji worked at the village for a while, but later found that he could help it more by working outside and supporting it with the income from his novels, plays and paintings. There has always been a strong artistic bent at the Mura (as distinct from other religious or political communes, or the well-known Israeli kibbutzim) and many well-known artists lived there or supported it externally. Although there is an art gallery which also produces some publications, and various members have at times worked as potters, for much of its existence, most of the community's income has come from agriculture, including battery-hen eggs (and fertilizer produced from their manure), shiitake, rice, organic vegetables, and to a lesser extent green tea, apricots, and bread. There used to be a nursery school.

The income earned by activities in the village is pooled, and individual members receive only 'pocket money', but all other needs are met, including housing, food, medical care, and schooling. Members live in their own houses, in 'conventional' family units with private possessions, but most food is eaten in a communal dining area which also has a stage used for occasional plays and concerts. There are monthly meetings to decide any matters affecting the village, and in principle all decisions must be unanimous.

The business plan for FY2022 (1 Jan - 31 Dec) states that five people were to leave at the end of March, bringing the population down to three, and the January 2024 journal includes a feature on 'the late' Kojima Masaki, who was listed as a 'long-term resident' in an Asahi Shimbun article of February 2023, so it seems likely the population is now a mere two people. The business plan also comments that "the price of solar power, the mainstay of the profit-making business, has fallen to less than a quarter of its peak and the deficit will increase in the future ... the deficit has been managed mainly thanks to donations from the Atarashiki-mura Tomo-no-kai (Friends), but [this is not sustainable]". The budget for 2022 showed donations (12m yen) dwarfing income from agriculture (1.6m), solar power (1.9m) and rental income from 新村堂 (a bookshop in Kanda; 1.8m). The balance sheet at that time shows 114m yen of land assets, with 21m each for works of art and buildings, versus negligible liabilities.

== Ideals ==
The "spirit of Atarashiki-mura" is summed up in six lines written by Mushanokōji and reprinted on the back of each issue of the village's magazine.

- Our ideal is that all the world's people should fulfil their own destinies, and that the individuality residing in each one of them should be allowed to grow fully.
- One must not therefore allow the promotion of one's own individuality to infringe upon the individuality of others.
- Hence one must promote one's own individuality in a correct manner. One must not harm the destiny or just demands of other people merely for the sake of one's own pleasure, happiness or freedom.
- We will work so that all the world's people may share our ideals and choose the same style of life, and thereby walk along a path where they are able to fulfil their duties equally, enjoy freedom, lead correct lives and fulfil their destinies (including individuality).
- Those who endeavour to live this way, who believe in the possibility of such a way of life and pray or hope fervently that all the world's people may put it into practice, such people are members of Atarashiki-mura and are our brothers and sisters.
- We therefore believe that if all people embark upon a correct way of life, or endeavour to do so, and such people truly cooperate with each other, then the world we desire will come to be without struggle between nations nor between classes. We will do our utmost to achieve this goal.

== Flag ==
The village has a flag, consisting of four colours (representing the four races) surrounded by blue (representing the world in which they should co-exist peacefully).

== See also ==
- Autonomous administrative division
- Intentional communities
- List of intentional communities
- Kibbutz
- Utopian
- Utopian socialism
- Cooperative
- Yamagishi movement
