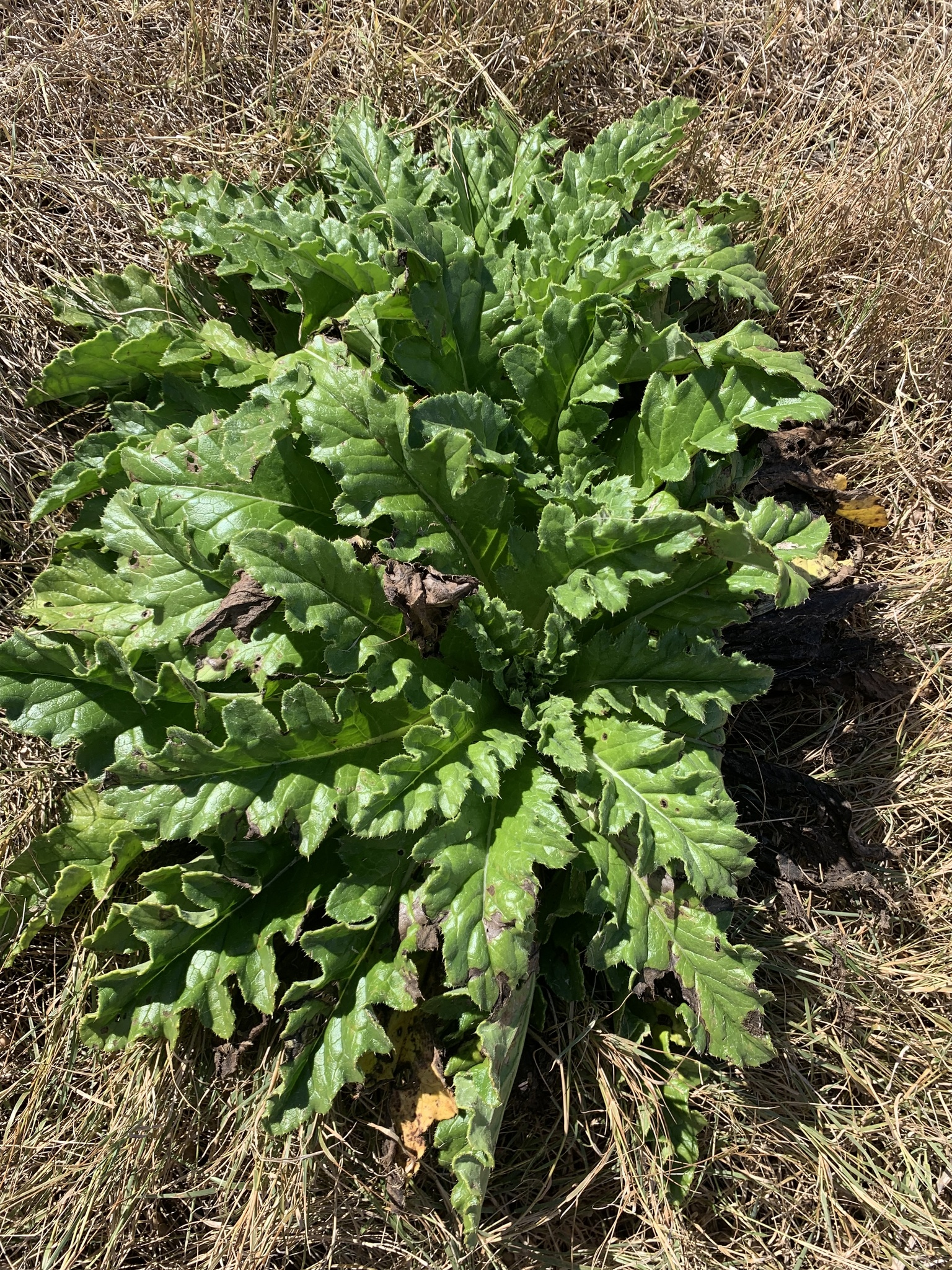

Scientific classification
- Kingdom: Plantae
- Clade: Tracheophytes
- Clade: Angiosperms
- Clade: Eudicots
- Clade: Asterids
- Order: Asterales
- Family: Asteraceae
- Genus: Cirsium
- Species: C. boninense

Binomial name
- Cirsium boninense Koidz.

= Cirsium boninense =

Species of plant

Cirsium boninense is a species of thistle in the family Asteraceae that is endemic to the Bonin Islands of Tōkyō Metropolis, Japan.

== Taxonomy ==
The species was first described by Japanese botanist Gen-ichi Koidzumi in 1914. The specific epithet relates to the type locality (Chichijima) in the Bonin Islands.

== Description ==
Cirsium boninense is a perennial plant with white flowers from May to June that grows to a height of 40–150 centimetres (16–59 in) among the grasses and rocks in coastal areas, as well as on the forest floor.

== Conservation status ==
Cirsium boninense is classed as Near Threatened on the Ministry of the Environment Red List. According to the Red Data Book Tokyo, though decreasing on Chichijima, numbers are increasing on Muko-jima and Nakōdo-jima.

== See also ==
- Cirsium toyoshimae
