= Ryōsuke Oguma =

Japanese baseball player

Ryōsuke Oguma 小熊凌祐
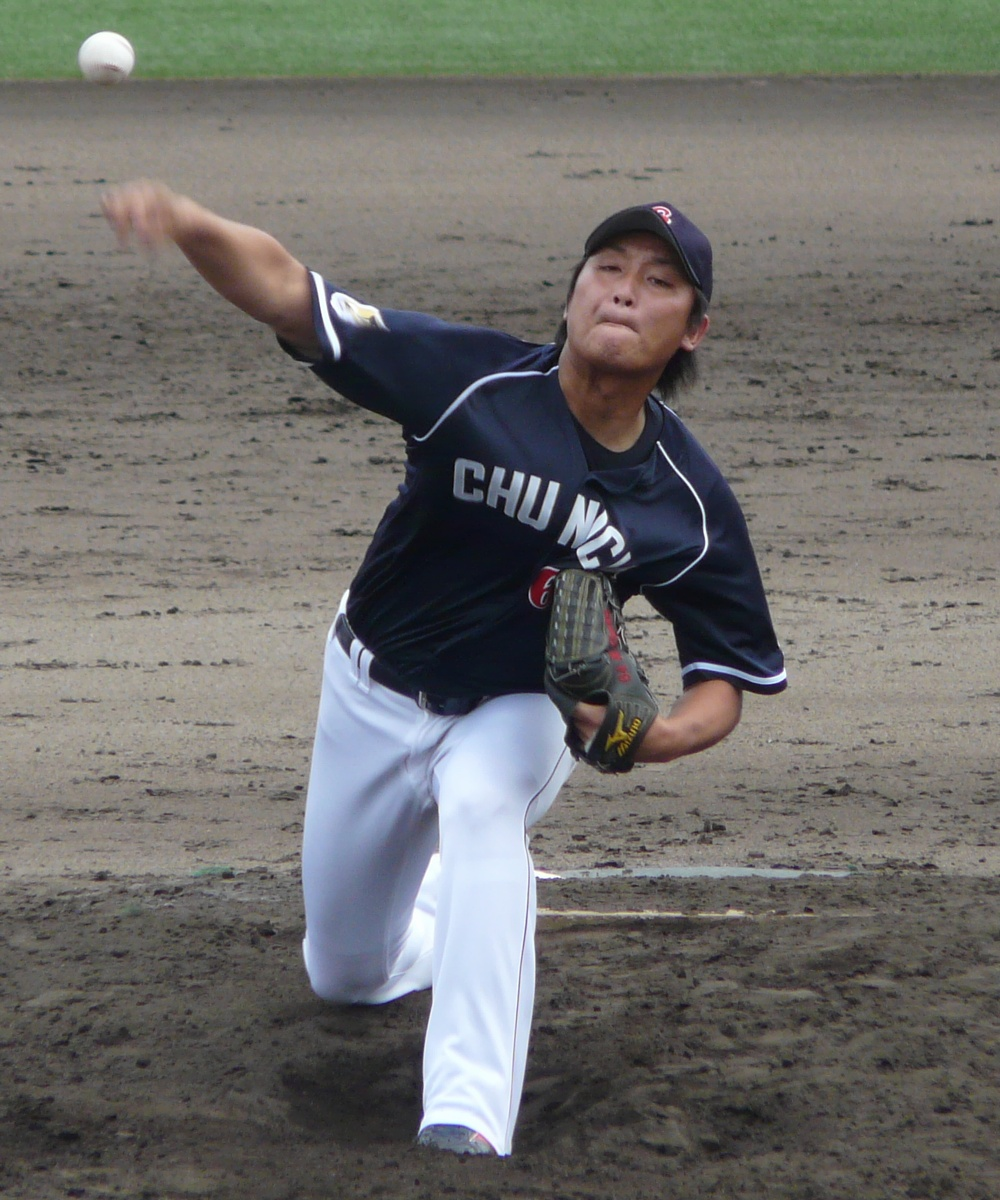
- Pitcher
- Born: August 11, 1990 (age 35); Moroyama, Saitama, Saitama Prefecture
- Batted: Right Threw: Right

NPB debut
- May 6, 2011, for the Chunichi Dragons

Last NPB appearance
- June 1, 2019, for the Chunichi Dragons

NPB statistics (through 2020 season)
- Win–loss record: 12–13
- ERA: 5.03
- Strikeouts: 137
- Stats at Baseball Reference

Teams
- Chunichi Dragons (2009–2020)

Ryōsuke Oguma (小熊凌祐, born August 11, 1990, in Moroyama, Saitama, Saitama Prefecture) is a Japanese former professional baseball pitcher who is currently a staff for Chunichi Dragons of the Nippon Professional Baseball. He has played in NPB for the Dragons.

== Career ==
Chunichi Dragons selected Oguma with the sixth selection in the 2008 NPB draft.

On May 6, 2011, Oguma made his NPB debut.

On December 2, 2020, he become a free agent.

On January 8, 2021, Oguma become a staff for Dragons.
