= Moro Station =

Railway station in Moroyama, Saitama Prefecture, Japan

Moro Station 毛呂駅
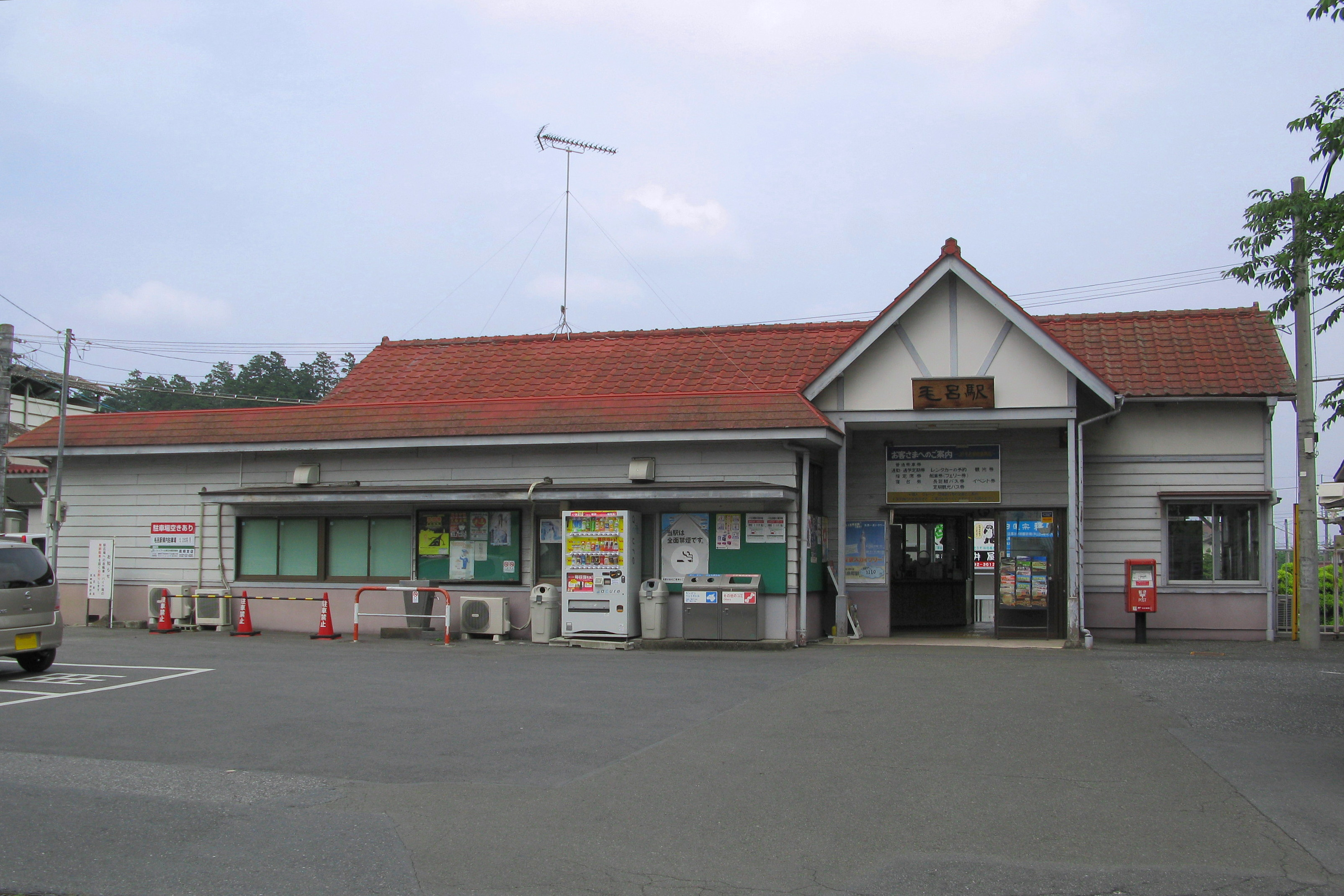
- The station entrance in May 2012

General information
- Location: Iwai, Moroyama-cho, Iruma-gun, Saitama-shi 350-0441; Japan
- Coordinates: 35.9410°N 139.3094°E
- Operator: JR East
- Line: ■ Hachikō Line
- Distance: 5.8 km from Komagawa
- Platforms: 2 side platforms
- Tracks: 2
- Connections: Bus stop

Other information
- Status: Staffed
- Website: Official website

History
- Opened: 15 April 1933

Passengers
- FY2019: 729 (daily, boarding only)

Services
Preceding station	JR East	Following station
Ogose towards Takasaki	Hachikō Line	Komagawa Terminus
Location
- Location within Saitama Prefecture Location within Japan

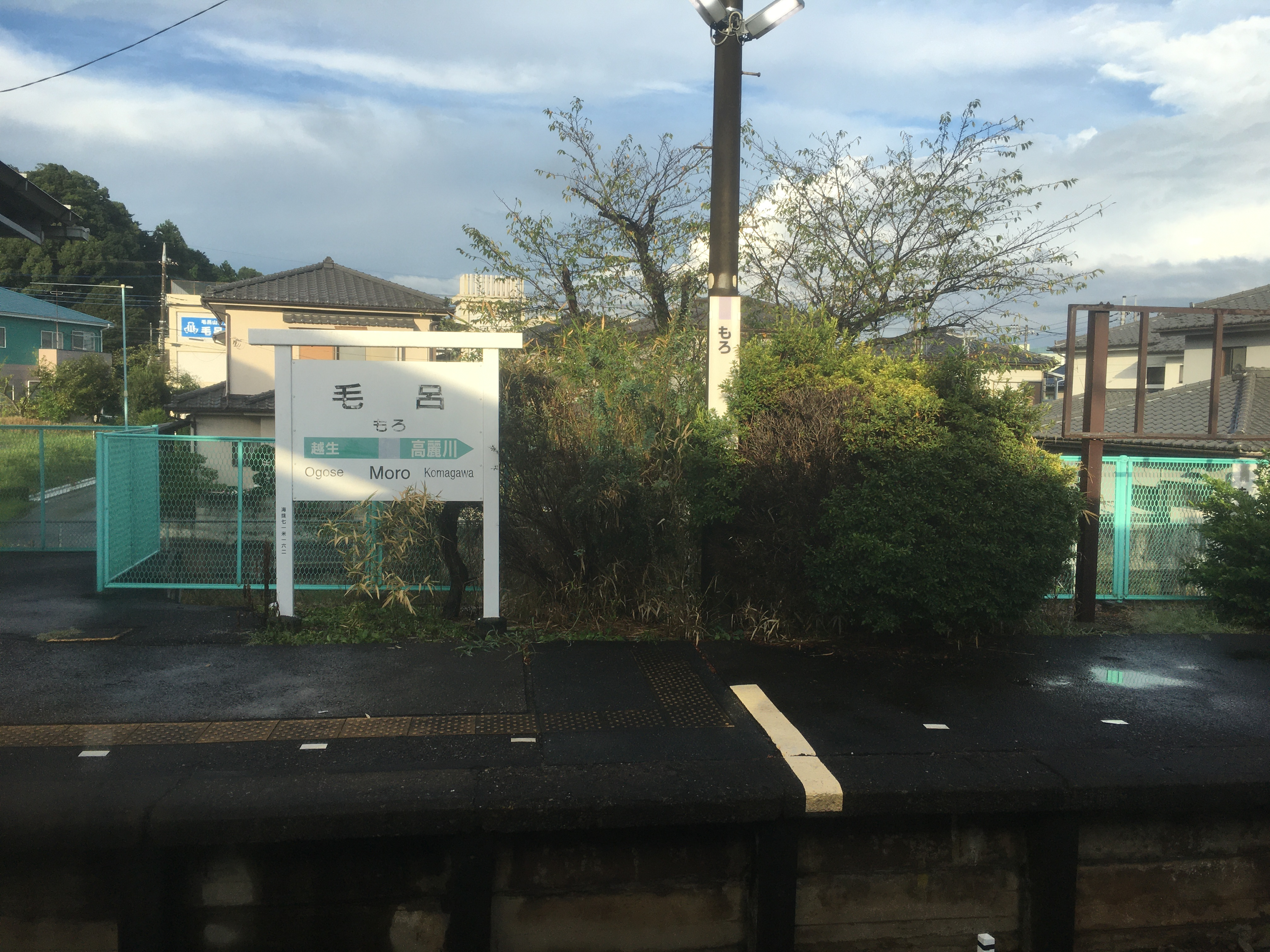
Moro Station platform, 2020

Moro Station (毛呂駅, Moro-eki) is a passenger railway station located in the town of Moroyama, Saitama, Japan, operated by East Japan Railway Company (JR East).

== Lines ==
Moro Station is served by the single-track Hachikō Line between Komagawa and Takasaki, and lies 5.8 km from the starting point of the Hachikō Line at Komagawa.

== Station layout ==
The station consists of two opposed side platforms serving two tracks, which form a passing loop on the single-track line. The station building is located on the west (northbound) side. The platforms are connected by a footbridge. A storage siding is located behind the southbound platform 1. The station is staffed.

=== Platforms ===
1	■ Hachikō Line	for Komagawa
2	■ Hachikō Line	for Ogawamachi, Yorii, and Takasaki

== History ==
The station opened on 15 April 1933. With the privatization of Japanese National Railways (JNR) on 1 April 1987, the station came under the control of JR East.

== Passenger statistics ==
In fiscal 2019, the station was used by an average of 686 passengers daily (boarding passengers only). The passenger figures for previous years are as shown below.

Fiscal year	Daily average
2000	905
2005	918
2010	738
2015	729

== Surrounding area ==
- Higashi-Moro Station (Tobu Ogose Line) (approximately 15 minutes' walk away)
- Saitama Medical School Moroyama Campus
- Moroyama Elementary School
- Moroyama Middle School
- Moroyama Town Hall
- Moroyama Post Office
- Moroyama Public Library

== Bus services ==
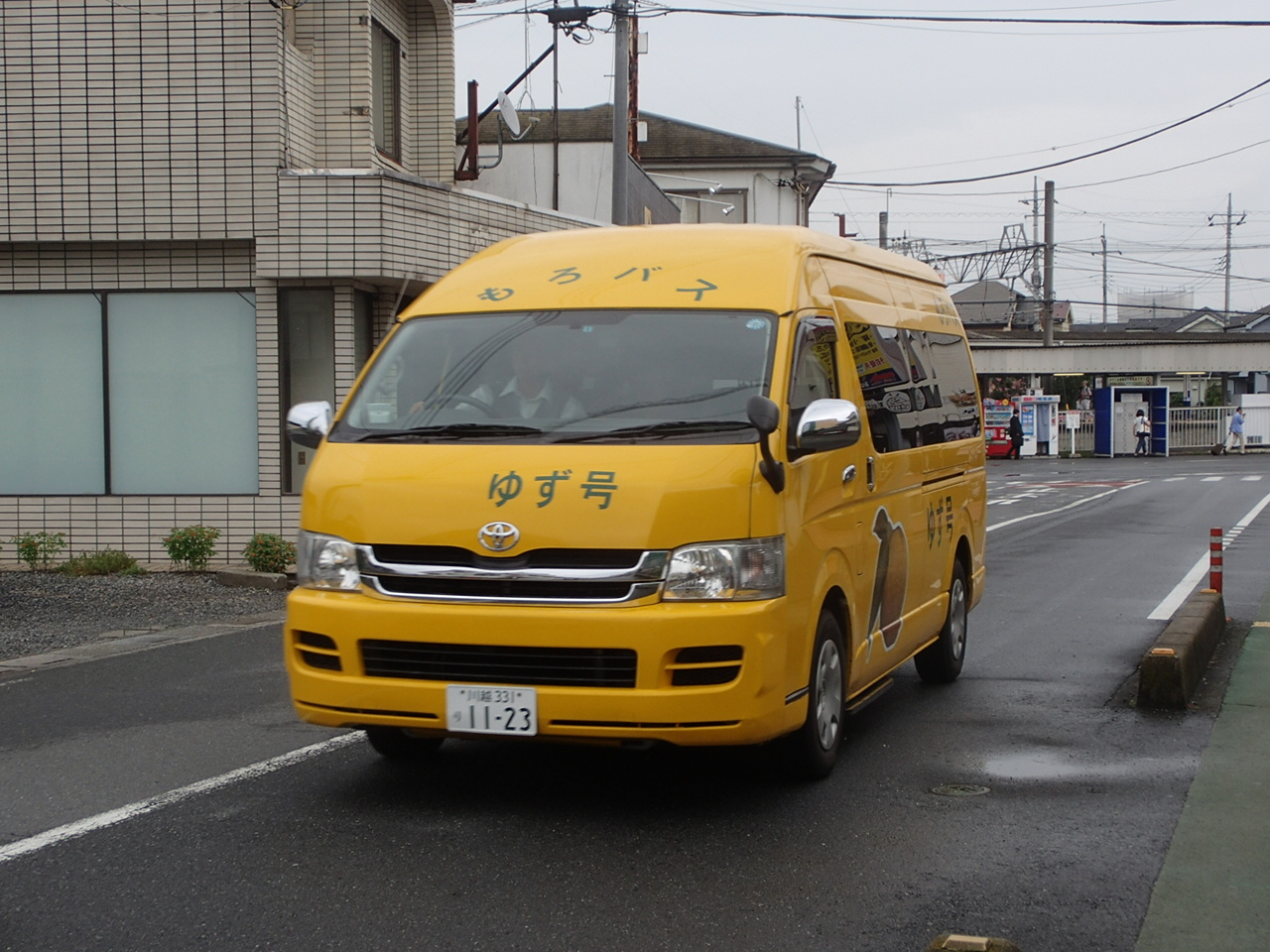
A "Moro Bus" community minibus in August 2014

Moro Station is served by the "Moro Bus" community minibus (Yuzu Yellow Line) service.

== See also ==
- List of railway stations in Japan
