= Mukojima Islands =

Group of Japanese islets

Coordinates: 27°40′00″N 142°07′59″E

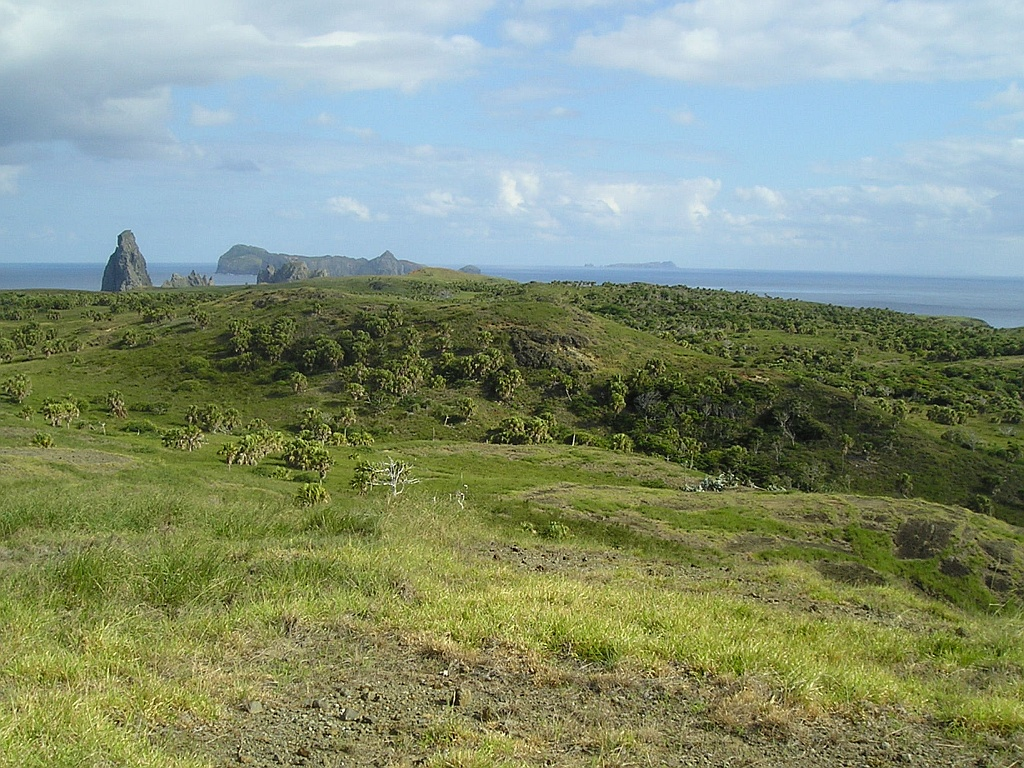
Mukojima Island view

The Mukojima Islands (聟島列島 Muko-jima Rettō) – formerly known as the Parry Group – are a group of uninhabited small islands with a collective land area of 586 ha. They lie some 900–1,100 km south of Tokyo in the Bonin Islands group of the Nanpō Archipelago of Japan. Islands in the group include Kitanojima, Mukojima, Nakōdo-jima, Yomejima, Maejima, with some other smaller islets. Mukojima, at 257 ha, is the largest in area, while Nakōdo-jima is the highest at 155 m. Their original forests have been severely reduced or damaged by browsing by feral goats, followed by erosion.

== Important Bird Area ==
The islands have been recognised as an Important Bird Area (IBA) by BirdLife International because they support populations of resident Japanese wood pigeons and Bonin white-eyes, as well as occurrent black-footed albatrosses.
