= Cirsium toyoshimae =

Conservation status
- Extinct

Scientific classification
- Kingdom: Plantae
- Clade: Tracheophytes
- Clade: Angiosperms
- Clade: Eudicots
- Clade: Asterids
- Order: Asterales
- Family: Asteraceae
- Genus: Cirsium
- Species: †C. toyoshimae

Binomial name
- †Cirsium toyoshimae Koidz.

Extinct species of plant

Cirsium toyoshimae (トヨシマアザミ, Toyoshima-azami) is an extinct species of thistle in the family Asteraceae that was endemic to the Bonin Islands of Tōkyō Metropolis, Japan.

== Taxonomy ==
The species was first described by Japanese botanist Gen-ichi Koidzumi in 1919.

== Description ==
Cirsium toyoshimae had pale purple flowers and soft spines and was somewhat smaller than the extant Cirsium boninense. It used to grow in wooded areas near the coast.

== Conservation status ==
Cirsium toyoshimae is classed as extinct on the Ministry of the Environment Red List.
