= Yuta Muto =

Japanese baseball player

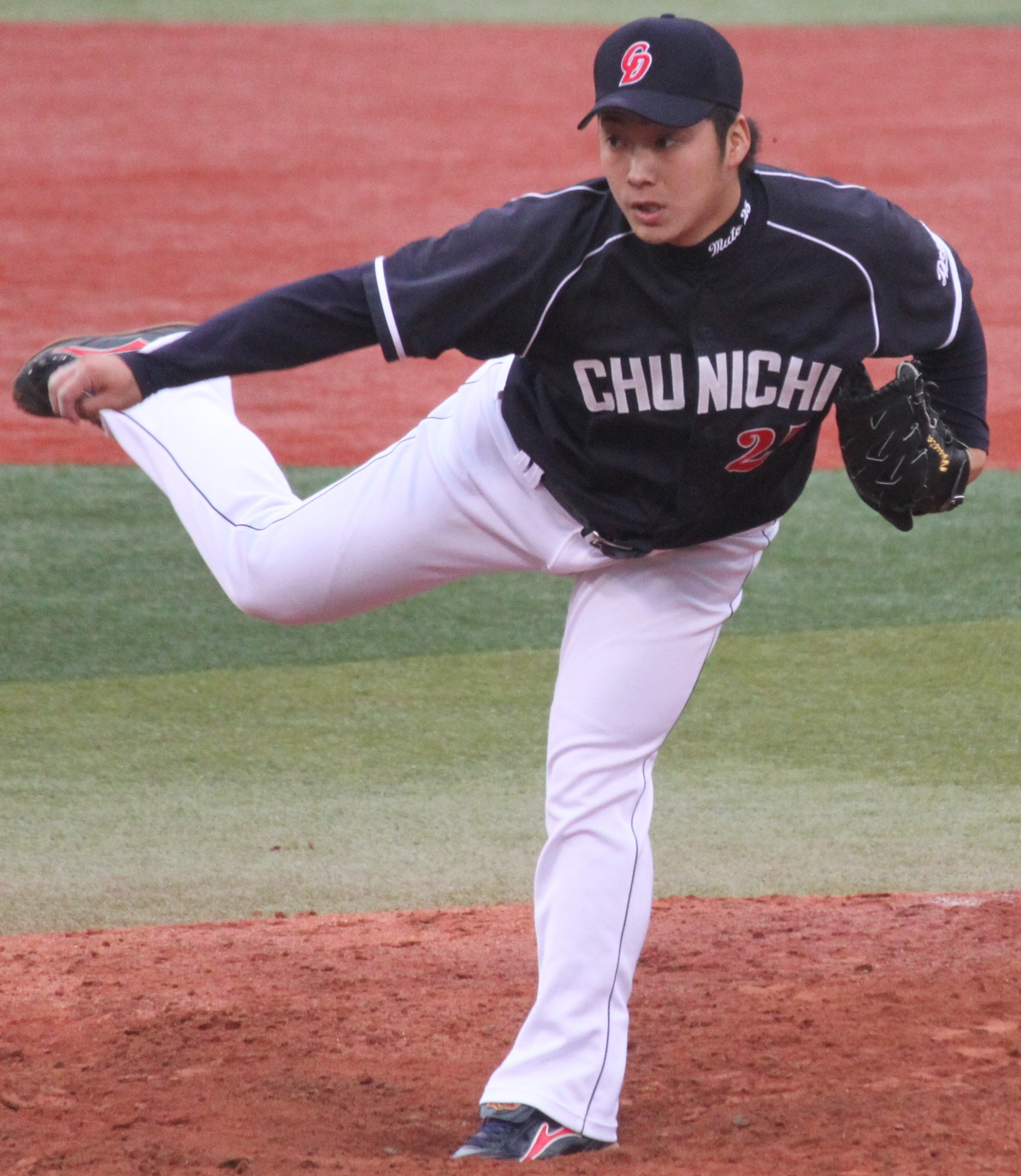
- Muto with the Chunichi Dragons
- Pitcher
- Born: June 14, 1989 (age 37)
- Batted: Right Threw: Right

NPB debut
- June 29, 2011, for the Chunichi Dragons

Last NPB appearance
- October 23, 2021, for the Yokohama DeNA BayStars

NPB statistics
- Win–loss record: 10–9
- ERA: 4.25
- Strikeouts: 185
- Stats at Baseball Reference

Teams
- Chunichi Dragons (2011–2016); Yokohama DeNA BayStars (2018–2021)

Yuta Muto (武藤 祐太; born June 14, 1989 in Moroyama, Saitama Prefecture) is a Japanese former professional baseball pitcher. He played in Nippon Professional Baseball (NPB) for the Chunichi Dragons from 2011 to 2016 and Yokohama DeNA BayStars from 2018 to 2021.
