= Ogose Station =

Railway station in Ogose, Saitama Prefecture, Japan

TJ47 Ogose Station 越生駅
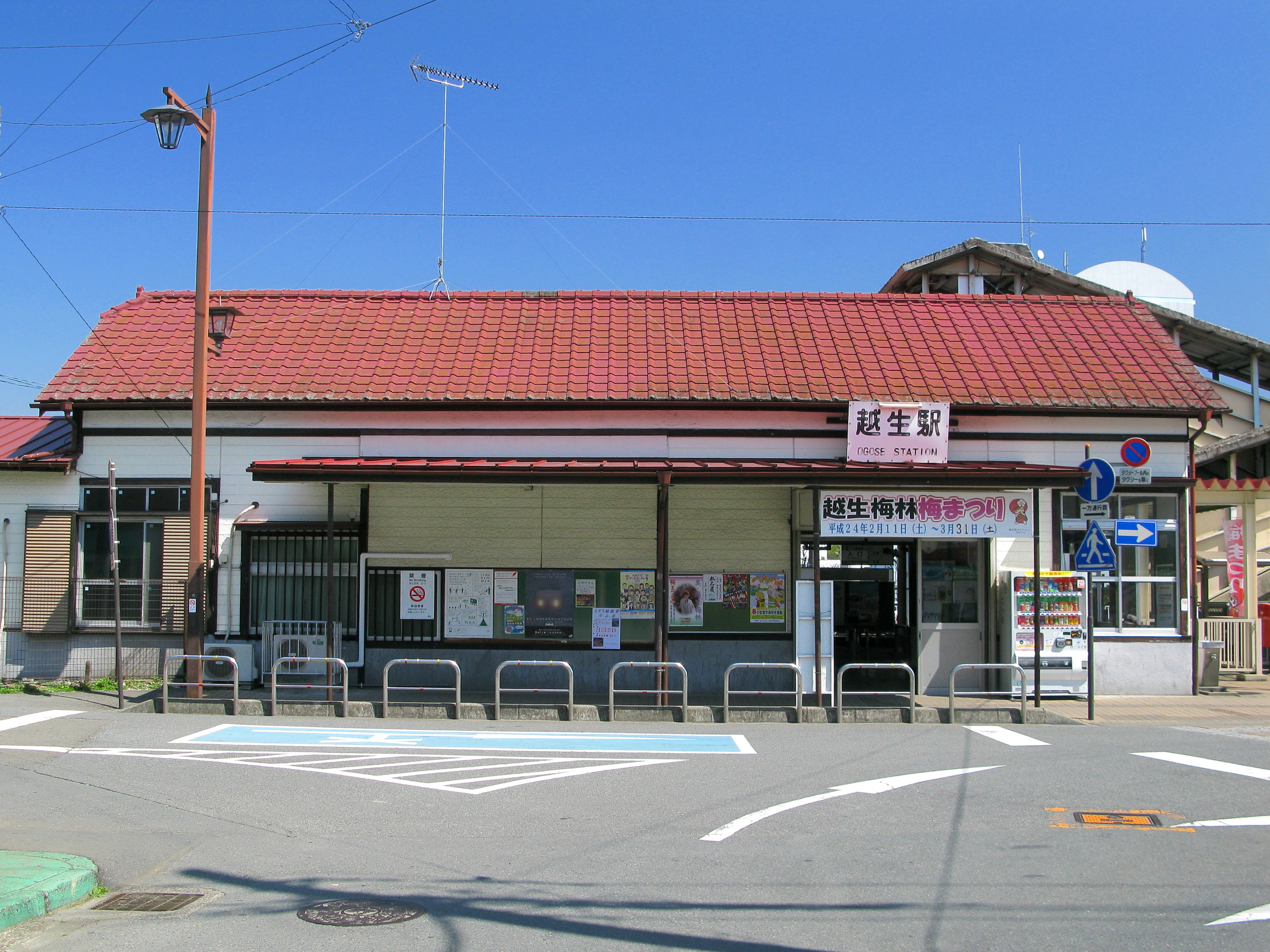
- The station entrance in March 2012

General information
- Location: Ogose, Ogose-machi, Iruma-gun, Saitama-ken 350-0416; Japan
- Coordinates: 35.9627°N 139.2994°E
- Operator: JR East; Tobu Railway
- Lines: ■ Hachiko Line; Tobu Ogose Line
- Distance: 39.6 km from Hachiōji
- Platforms: 2 island platforms
- Tracks: 3

Other information
- Status: Unstaffed
- Station code: TJ-47 (Tobu)

History
- Opened: 15 April 1933

Services
Preceding station	JR East	Following station
Myōkaku towards Takasaki	Hachikō Line	Moro towards Komagawa
Preceding station	Tobu Railway	Following station
Terminus	Ogose Line	Bushū-Karasawa TJ46 towards Sakado
Location
- Location within Saitama Prefecture Location within Japan

Ogose Station (越生駅, Ogose-eki) is a junction passenger railway station located in the town of Ogose, Saitama, Japan, jointly operated by East Japan Railway Company (JR East) and the private railway operator Tōbu Railway.

== Lines ==
Ogose Station is served by the single-track Hachikō Line between Komagawa and Takasaki, and also forms the terminus of the 10.9 km Tōbu Ogose Line single-track branch from Sakado. The station lies 8.5 km from the starting point of the Hachikō Line at Komagawa.

== Station layout ==
The station consists of two island platforms for Tōbu and JR East respectively. The JR East platform serves only one track since the removal of the track on platform 1 in April 2013 to allow construction of a passenger lift. An additional storage track is located on the east side of the Tōbu platform. The station is unattended.

The toilets located on the north end of the Tōbu platform were removed in 2013 when the platform was lengthened as part of the work to add lift access to the platforms.

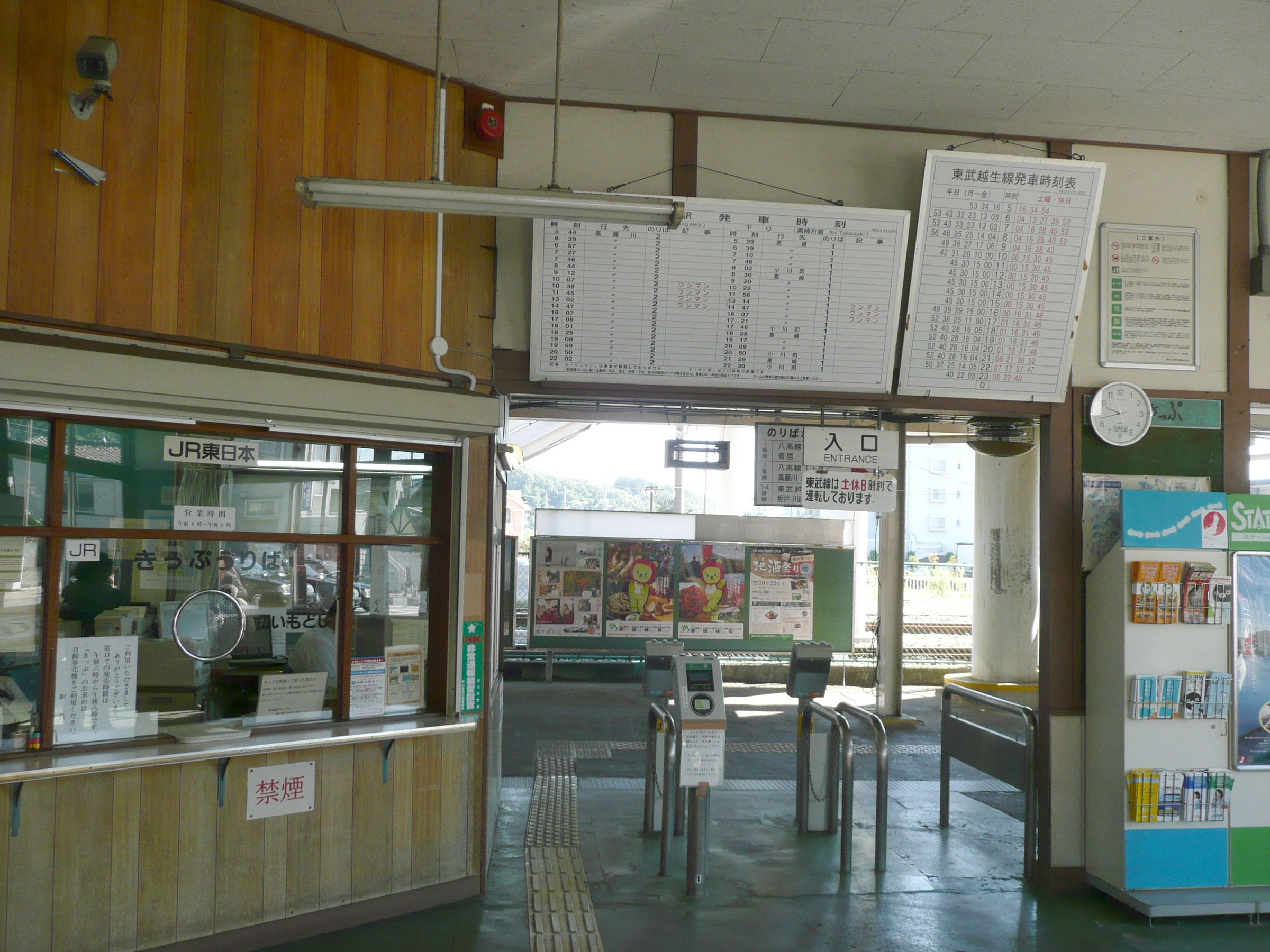
Shared JR East and Tobu entrance, September 2011

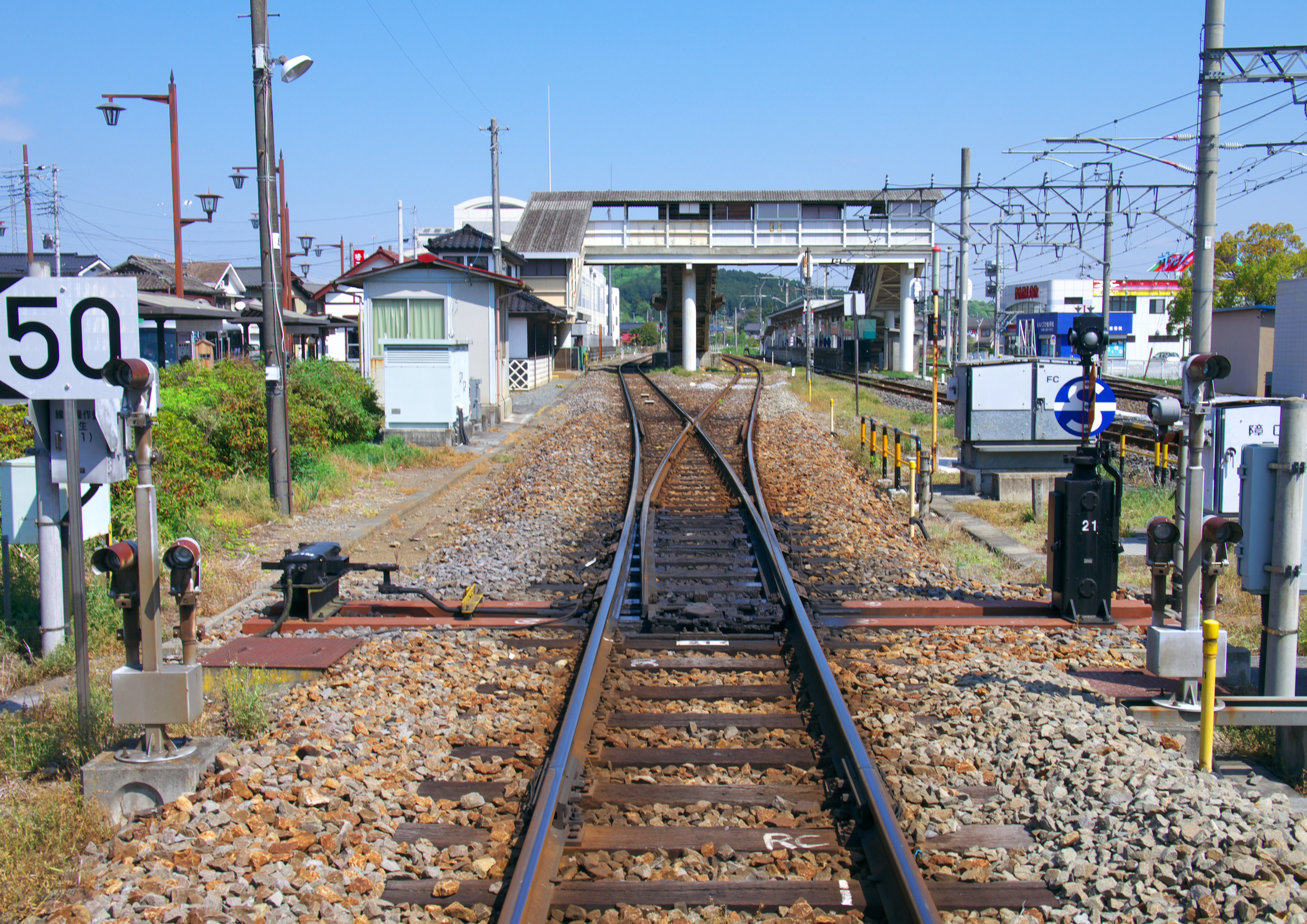
View of the station from the south before the removal of the platform 1 track on the left, with the Tōbu Ogose Line platforms on the right, April 2011

=== Platforms ===
2	■ Hachiko Line	for Ogawamachi, Yorii, and Takasaki for Komagawa
3/4	■ Tōbu Ogose Line	for Kawakado and Sakado

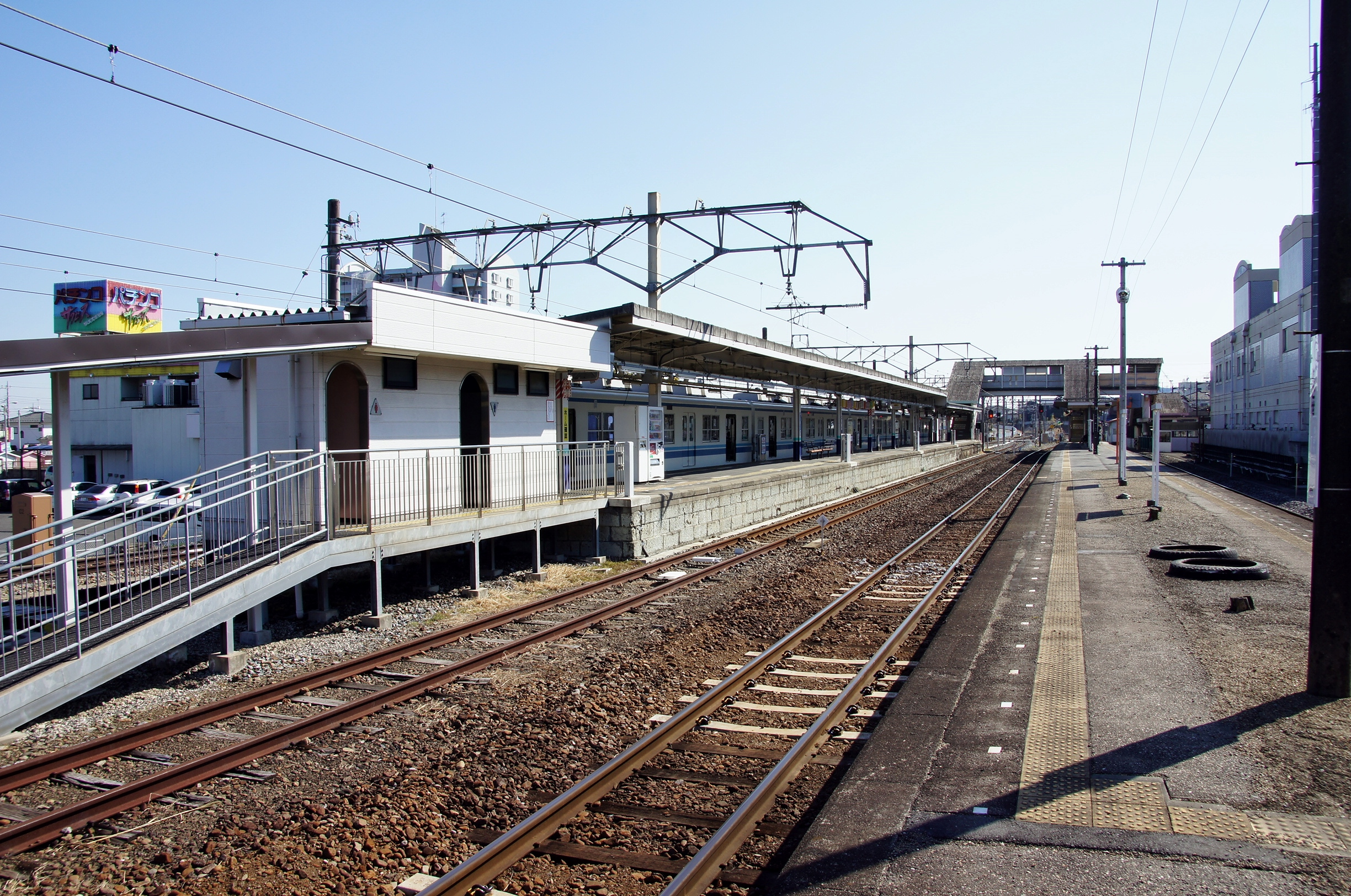
View of the JR East platforms looking south, with the former platform 1 on the right, and the Tōbu platforms and former toilet block on the left, February 2012

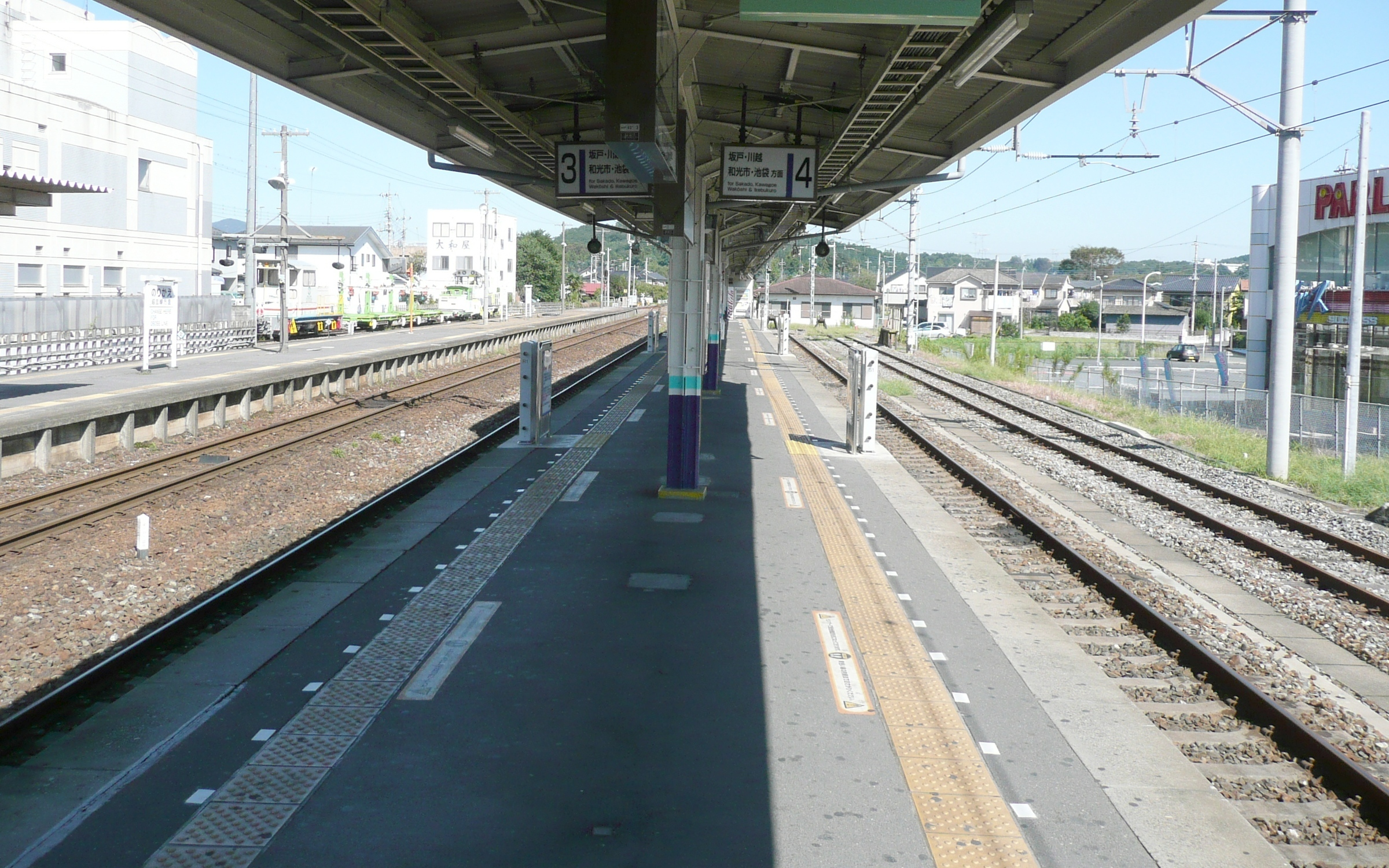
View of the Tōbu Ogose Line platforms 3 and 4, September 2011

== History ==
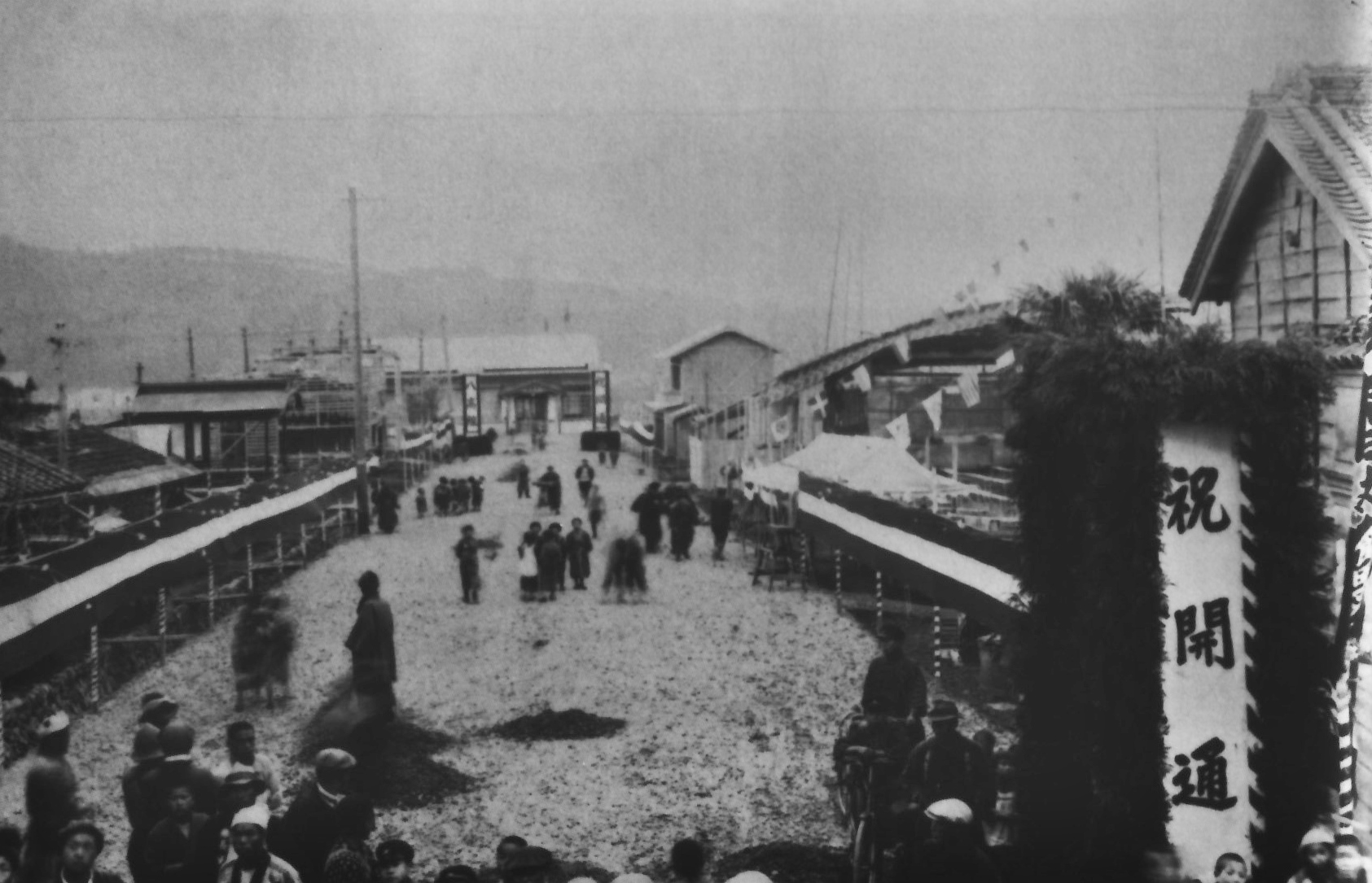
Ogose Station on the day of its opening in 1933

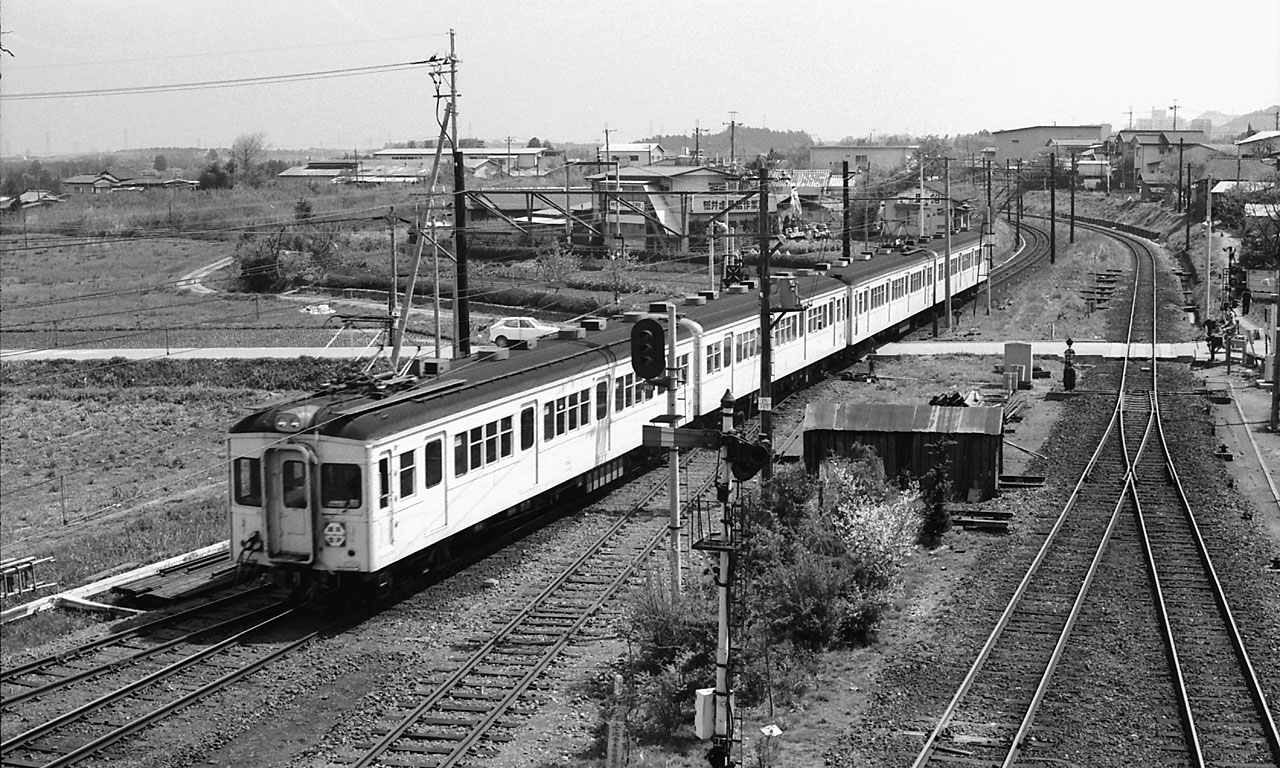
A Tōbu 7800 series 4-car EMU approaching Ogose Station in April 1977

The JR East station (formerly JNR) opened on 15 April 1933. The Tōbu station opened on 16 December 1934.

From 17 March 2012, station numbering was introduced on the Tōbu Ogose Line, with Ogose Station becoming "TJ-47".

In 2013, construction work started to add lift access between the platforms and the station entrance. This entailed lifting the track serving platform 1, removal of the toilet block at the north end of the Tobu platform, and lengthening the Tobu platform by one car length to the north.

== Passenger statistics ==
In fiscal 2017, the JR station was used by an average of 778 passengers daily (boarding passengers only).

In fiscal 2019, the Tōbu station was used by an average of 3,666 passengers daily.

The passenger figures for previous years are as shown below. (JR East figures are for boarding passengers only.)

Fiscal year	JR East	Tobu
2000	973	—N/a
2005	732	—N/a
2010	741	4,221

== Surrounding area ==
- Saitama Prefectural Ogose High School

== See also ==
- List of railway stations in Japan
