= Nakōdo-jima =

Uninhabited island of the Bonin Islands, Japan

Native name: Japanese: 媒島
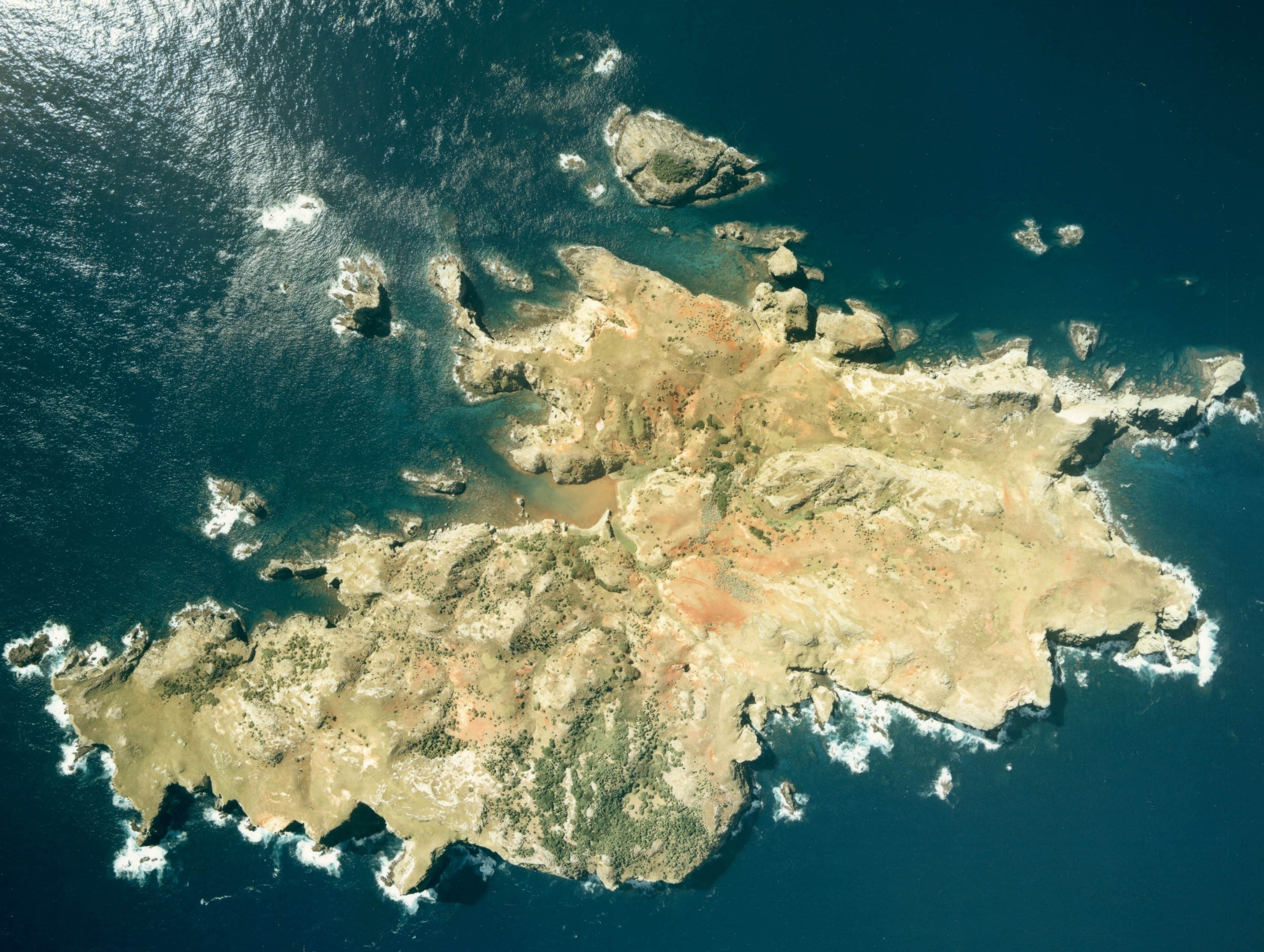
- Aerial view of Nakōdo-jima, courtesy of MLIT

- Location within Japan

Geography
- Location: Pacific Ocean
- Coordinates: 27°37′40″N 142°10′42″E
- Archipelago: Ogasawara Islands
- Area: 1.37 km^{2} (0.53 sq mi)
- Highest elevation: 154.9 m (508.2 ft)

Administration
- Japan
- Prefecture: Tokyo
- Subprefecture: Ogasawara Subprefecture
- Village: Ogasawara

Demographics
- Population: uninhabited

Nakōdo-jima (媒島) is an uninhabited Japanese island in the Mukojima Islands (formerly known as the Parry Group), the northernmost island group of the Bonin Islands, in the village of Ogasawara, Tokyo Metropolis. The entire island and its surrounding waters form part of Ogasawara National Park, while an area of 147 hectares (360 acres) including surrounding reefs forms part of the Ogaswara Islands UNESCO World Heritage Site.

== Geography ==
The highest point on the island (and the Muko-jima Group) is Mount Byōbu (屏風山), at 154.9 metres (508 ft).

== Natural history ==
The island is a breeding ground for the brown booby (Sula leucogaster) and black-footed albatross (Phoebastria nigripes). Vegetation, including Pandanus boninensis, Lobelia boninensis, and Cirsium boninense, has been recovering since the eradication of goats introduced when the island was inhabited between the 1880s and 1944, and feral once the island was again uninhabited.

== Related maps and images ==
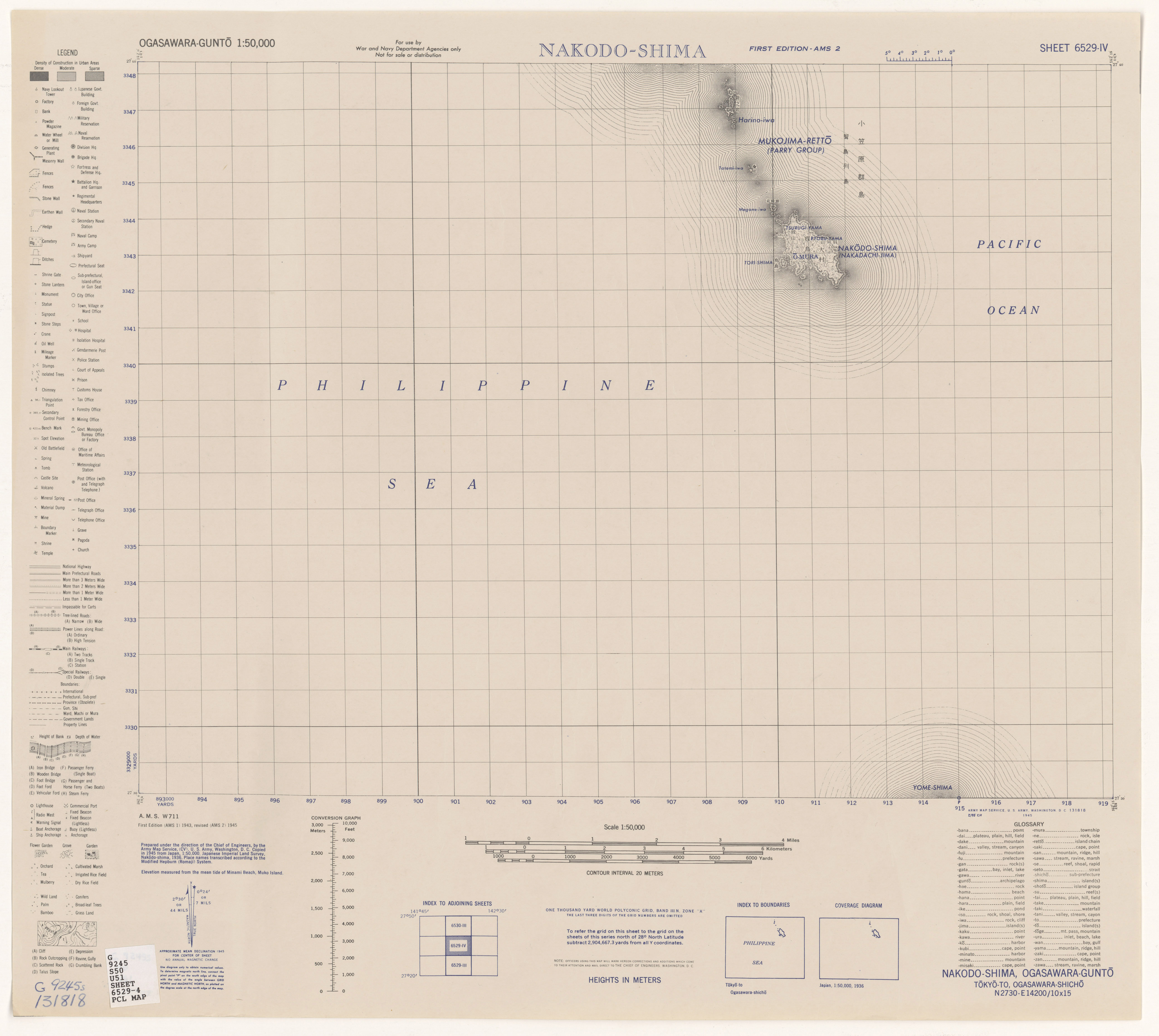
US AMS 1945 map of the southern islands in the Mukojima Islands

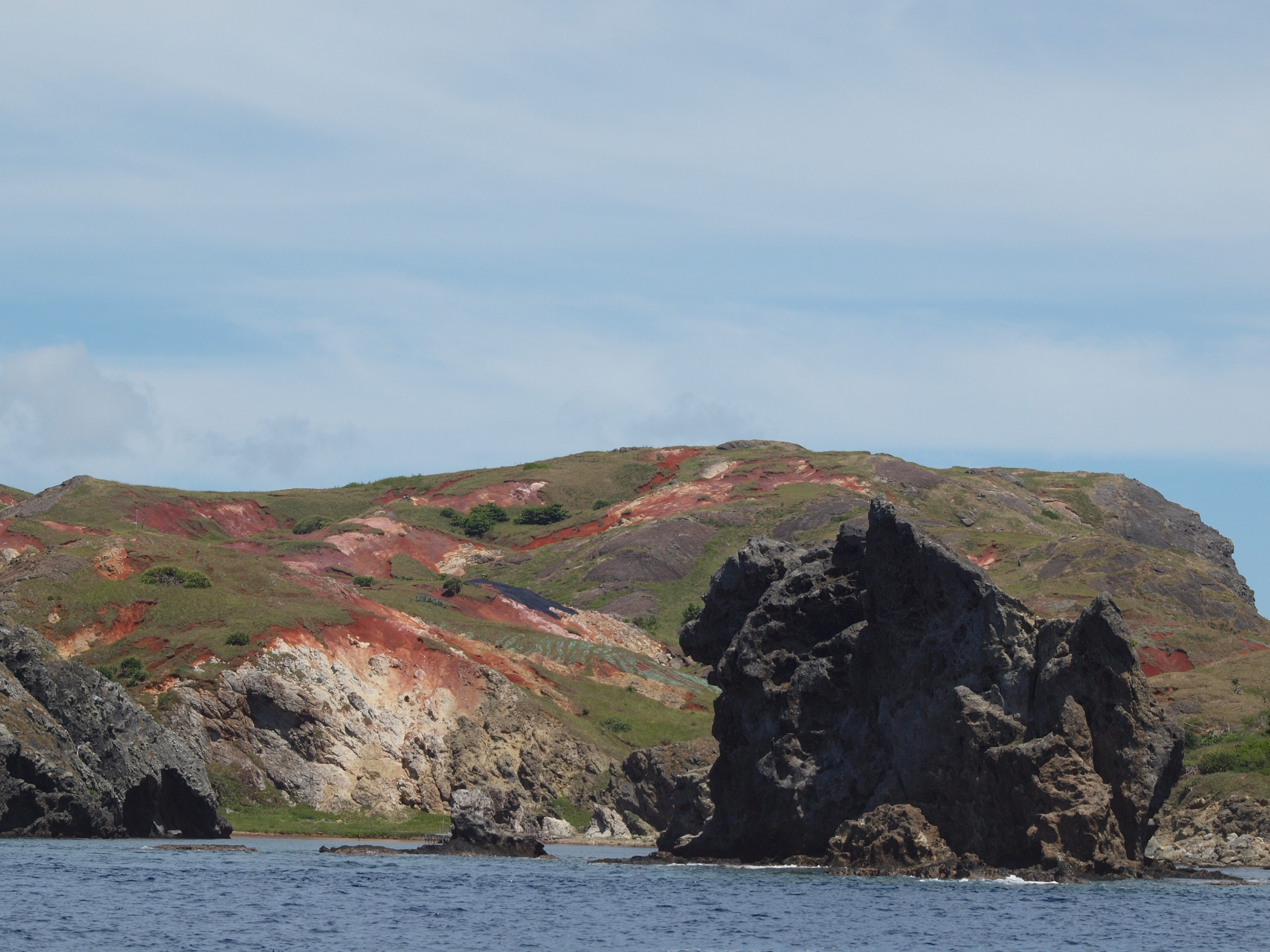
View of Nakōdo-jima from the sea

== See also ==
- Bonin greenfinch
- Mukojima white-eye
