= Moroyama =

Moroyama 毛呂山町
- Town
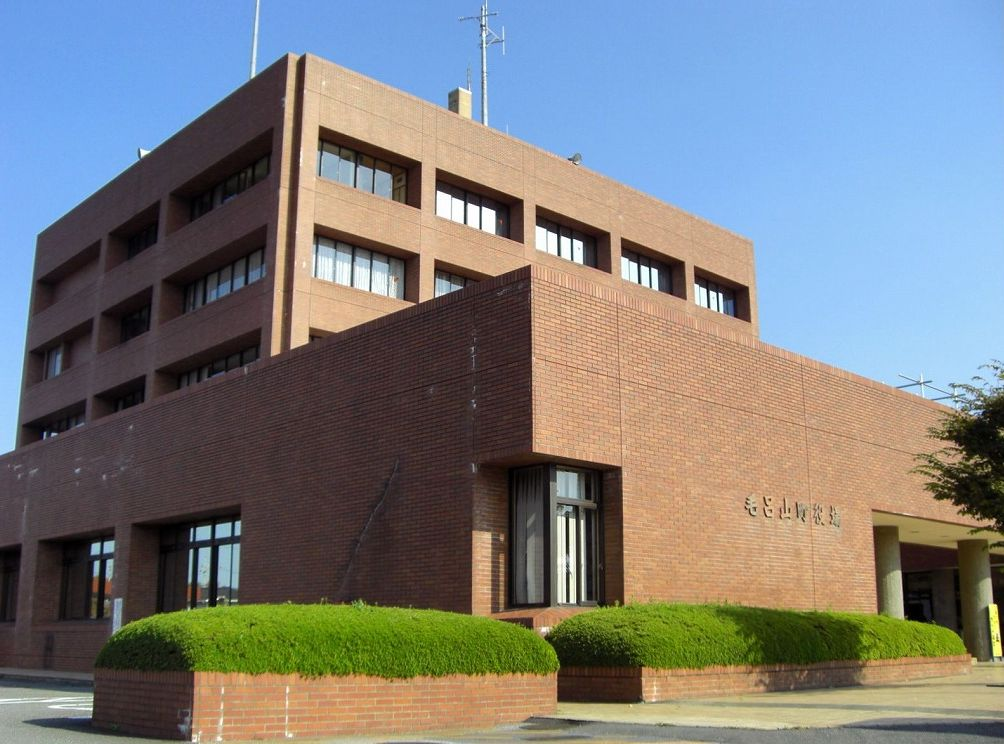
- Moroyama town office

- Flag Seal

- Location of Moroyama in Saitama Prefecture

- Coordinates: 35°56′29.5″N 139°18′57.6″E
- Country: Japan
- Region: Kantō
- Prefecture: Saitama
- District: Iruma

Area
  - Total: 34.07 km^{2} (13.15 sq mi)

Population (January 2021)
  - Total: 33,178
  - Density: 973.8/km^{2} (2,522/sq mi)
- Time zone: UTC+9 (Japan Standard Time)
- Tree: Yuzu
- Flower: Chrysanthemum
- Bird: Japanese white-eye
- Mascot: Moromaru-kun
- Phone number: 049-295-2112
- Address: 1291 Iwai, Moroyama-machi, Iruma-gun, Saitama-ken 350-0441
- Website: Official website

Moroyama (毛呂山町, Moroyama-machi) is a town located in Saitama Prefecture, Japan. As of 1 January 2021, the town had an estimated population of 33,178 in 15,888 households and a population density of 970 persons per km^{2}. The total area of the town is 34.07 square kilometres (13.15 sq mi).

== Geography ==
Located in central Saitama Prefecture, Moroyama is approximately 50 kilometers from downtown Tokyo. The town straddles the Hachioji Tectonic Line where the Chichibu Mountains and the Kanto Plain meet, with gentle mountains in the west with an elevation of about 300–400 meters above sea level. From the central part to the eastern part, the town consists of flat land with an elevation of about 60 meters above sea level. Approximately 40 percent of the town area is forest and mountains, with a portion within the borders of the Kuroyama Prefectural Nature Park.

=== Surrounding municipalities ===
Saitama Prefecture

- Hannō
- Hatoyama
- Hidaka
- Ogose
- Sakado

=== Climate ===
Moroyama has a humid subtropical climate (Köppen Cfa) characterized by warm summers and cool winters with light to no snowfall. The average annual temperature in Moroyama is 13.3 °C. The average annual rainfall is 1746 mm with September as the wettest month. The temperatures are highest on average in August, at around 25.0 °C, and lowest in January, at around 1.6 °C.

== Demographics ==
Per Japanese census data, the population of Moroyama peaked around the year 2000 and has declined since.

Historical population
Year	Pop.	±%
1940	8,456	—
1950	10,823	+28.0%
1960	11,173	+3.2%
1970	20,006	+79.1%
1980	31,197	+55.9%
1990	38,746	+24.2%
2000	39,711	+2.5%
2010	39,054	−1.7%
2020	35,366	−9.4%

== History ==
The area around Moroyama has been inhabited since at least the Jōmon period, and numerous archaeological sites are within the town limits. The area of the town is within the borders of ancient Musashi Province. Moro village was created within Iruma District, Saitama with the establishment of the modern municipalities system on April 1, 1889. Moro merged with neighboring Yamane village to form the town of Moroyama on April 1, 1939. Also in 1939, the author Saneatsu Mushanokoji founded Atarashiki-mura, an agricultural commune, which he intended for form the nucleus of a utopian settlement. Moroyama annexed neighboring Kawakado village on April 1, 1955. Road paving and housing developments in the early 1960s brought urbanization, population growth and change to areas previously devoted to mulberry fields. This new urban environment led to changes in the industrial structure including decreases in the agricultural population and an increase in the manufacturing and service industries.

== Government ==
Moroyama has a mayor-council form of government with a directly elected mayor and a unicameral town council of 14 members. Moroyama, together with the towns of Hatoyama and Ogose, contributes one member to the Saitama Prefectural Assembly. In terms of national politics, the town is part of Saitama 9th district of the lower house of the Diet of Japan.

== Economy ==
Moroyama remains largely an agricultural town, although it has increasingly become a bedroom community.

== Education ==
- Saitama Medical University
- Nihon Institute of Medical Science
- Saitama Medical University College
- Moroyama has four public elementary schools and two public middle schools operated by the town government, and one public high school operated by the Saitama Prefectural Board of Education. There is also one private middle school. The prefectural also operates one special education school for the handicapped.

== Transportation ==
=== Railway ===
JR East – Hachikō Line

- Moro

Tōbu Railway - Tōbu Ogose Line

- Higashi-Moro - Bushū-Nagase - Kawakado

=== Highway ===
Moroyama is not served by any expressways or national highways

== Local attractions ==
- Atarashiki-mura
- Izumoiwai Jinja
- Kamakita Lake

== Notable people ==
- Yuta Muto, professional baseball player
- Daiya Seto, World gold medalist swimmer
