= Nihon Institute of Medical Science =

Private university in Saitama, Japan

Coordinates: 35°55′55.5″N 139°20′36.4″E

- 日本医療科学大学
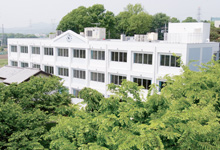
- Nihon Institute of Medical Science
- Type: Private university
- Established: 2007
- Location: Moroyama, Saitama, Japan

Nihon Institute of Medical Science (日本医療科学大学, Nihon iryō kagaku daigaku) is a private university in Moroyama, Saitama, Japan, established in 2007.

The Nihon Institute of Medical Science was established in 1918 as Josai Business School. In 1984, it was reorganized into the Josai College of Medical Arts & Sciences., a vocational college, and took its present name in 2007. It is located next to Josai University in neighboring Sakado, Saitama.

The school has a Department of Radiological Technology, Department of Nursing, Department of Physical Therapy, Department of Occupational Therapy and Department of Clinical Engineering.
