= Saitama Medical University College =

Coordinates: 35°56′18″N 139°18′19″E

Saitama Medical University College (埼玉医科大学短期大学, Saitama Ika Daigaku Tanki Daigaku) is a private junior college in Moroyama, Saitama, Japan, established in 1989.
