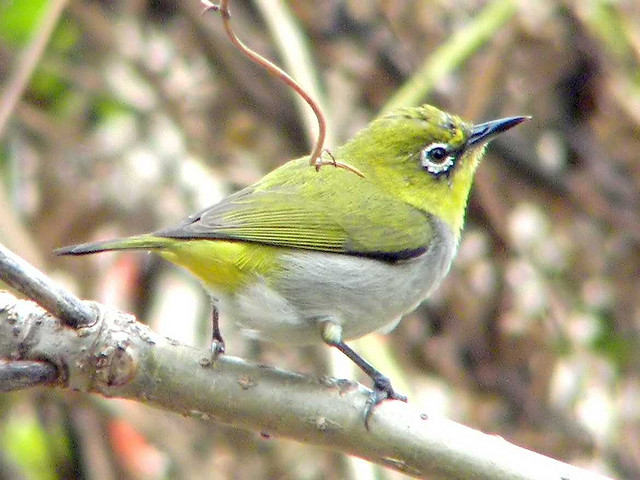
- In Hong Kong

Conservation status
- Least Concern (IUCN 3.1)

Scientific classification
- Kingdom: Animalia
- Phylum: Chordata
- Class: Aves
- Order: Passeriformes
- Family: Zosteropidae
- Genus: Zosterops
- Species: Z. simplex

Binomial name
- Zosterops simplex R. Swinhoe, 1861

= Swinhoe's white-eye =

Species of bird

Swinhoe's white-eye (Zosterops simplex) is a bird species in the white-eye family, Zosteropidae. It is found in eastern China, Taiwan, north Vietnam, the Thai-Malay Peninsula, Sumatra and Borneo. Additionally, populations have also been introduced to Southern California, where their population has been expanding rapidly.

== Taxonomy ==
Swinhoe's white-eye was formally described in 1861 by the English naturalist Robert Swinhoe, who assigned it the binomial name Zosterops simplex. The genus Zosterops had been introduced by the naturalists Nicholas Vigors and Thomas Horsfield in 1827. The genus name combines the Ancient Greek words zōstēros meaning "belt" or "girdle" and ōpos meaning "eye". The specific epithet simplex is Latin meaning "simple" or "plain".

This species was previously considered a subspecies group of the Japanese white-eye (Zosterops japonicus), but based on the results of a molecular phylogenetic study published in 2018, it was elevated it to full species status.

Five subspecies are recognised:

- Z. s. simplex R. Swinhoe, 1861 – eastern China, Taiwan and extreme northeast Vietnam
- Z. s. hainanus Hartert, 1923 – Hainan (off southeast China)
- Z. s. erwini (Chasen, 1935) – coastal Thai-Malay Peninsula, lowland Sumatra, Riau Islands, Bangka Island, Natuna Islands and lowland west Borneo
- Z. s. williamsoni Robinson & Kloss, 1919 – Gulf of Thailand coast and west Cambodia
- Z. s. salvadorii Meyer, AB & Wiglesworth, 1894 – Enggano Island (west Sumatra)
