= Muko-jima =

Uninhabited island of the Bonin Islands, Japan

Native name: Japanese: 聟島
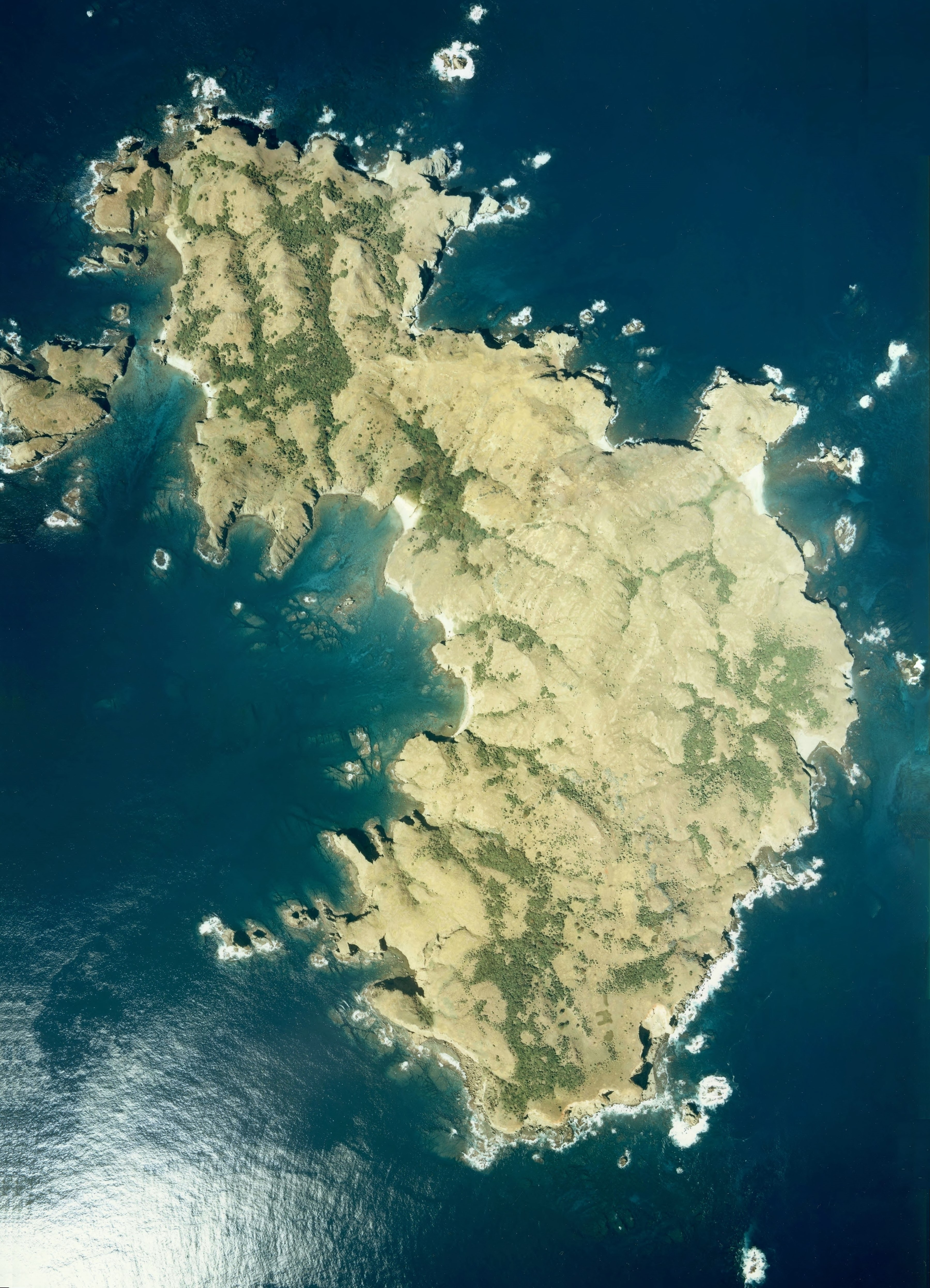
- Aerial view of Muko-jima, courtesy of MLIT
- Interactive map of Muko-jima

Geography
- Location: Pacific Ocean
- Archipelago: Ogasawara Islands

Administration
- Japan
- Prefecture: Tokyo
- Subprefecture: Ogasawara Subprefecture
- Village: Ogasawara

Demographics
- Population: uninhabited

Muko-jima (聟島) is an uninhabited Japanese island in the Mukojima Islands (formerly known as the Parry Group), the northernmost island group of the Bonin Islands, in the village of Ogasawara, Tokyo Metropolis. The entire island and its surrounding waters form part of Ogasawara National Park, while an area of 147 hectares (360 acres) including surrounding reefs forms part of the Ogaswara Islands UNESCO World Heritage Site.
