= Saitama Medical University =

Higher education institution in Saitama Prefecture, Japan

Coordinates: 35°56′22″N 139°18′19″E

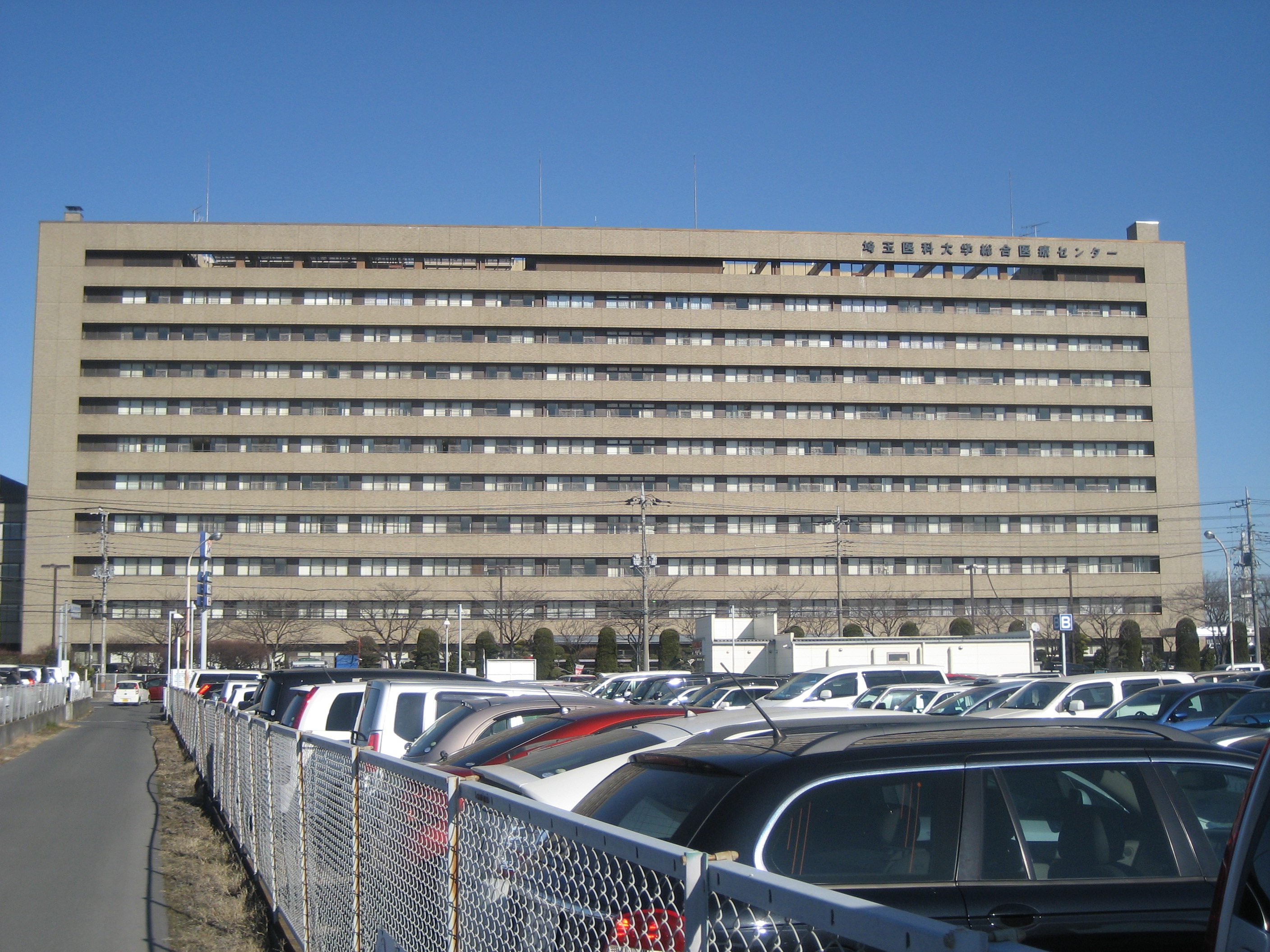
Saitama Medical School Saitama-medical-center

Saitama Medical University (埼玉医科大学, Saitama Ika Daigaku) is a private university at Moroyama, Saitama, Japan. The predecessor of the school, the Moro Hospital, was founded in 1892, and it was chartered as a university in 1972.

== Alumni ==
- Takashi Mitsubayashi - politician
