= Ryoji Yamagishi =

Ryoji Yamagishi (山岸 良二, Yamagishi Ryōji; born 1951) is a Japanese archaeologist, national director of the Japanese Archaeological Association. A graduate of Keio University and Toho University, his work ranges from a history of the Jōmon-Yayoi people and Narashino cavalry, to culture in the Sea of Japan area and ancient farming practices.
