= Japanese white-eye =

The Japanese white-eye (Zosterops japonicus) is a former species designation of birds in the white-eye family. Since 2018, it has been divided into two species:

- Swinhoe's white-eye, Zosterops simplex
- Warbling white-eye, Zosterops japonicus
