= Yamagishi movement =

The Yamagishi movement (alternatively Yamagishi Association) is a network of egalitarian intentional communities which originated in Japan. People in these communities live without money and with minimal personal possessions, but their needs are provided for by the community. There are no bosses or set working hours. Their primary industries are farming and ranching.

== History ==
The movement began in 1956, when Miyozo Yamagishi (1901 – 1961) and a group of his followers pooled their resources. It was based on Miyozo's vision of harmonization between humanity and nature called ittai (“one body” or "unity" in Japanese). He and his followers established the first commune in 1958 in Mie Prefecture.

By 2008, the group had about 1,200 members in Japan.

== Worldwide ==
The group has communities in Australia, Brazil, Thailand, South Korea, Switzerland and the United States.

== Lawsuits and criticism ==
The movement has been sued by former members seeking to recover their financial assets, which were required to be donated when they joined. The movement has also been criticized by the media in Japan for child welfare issues.
