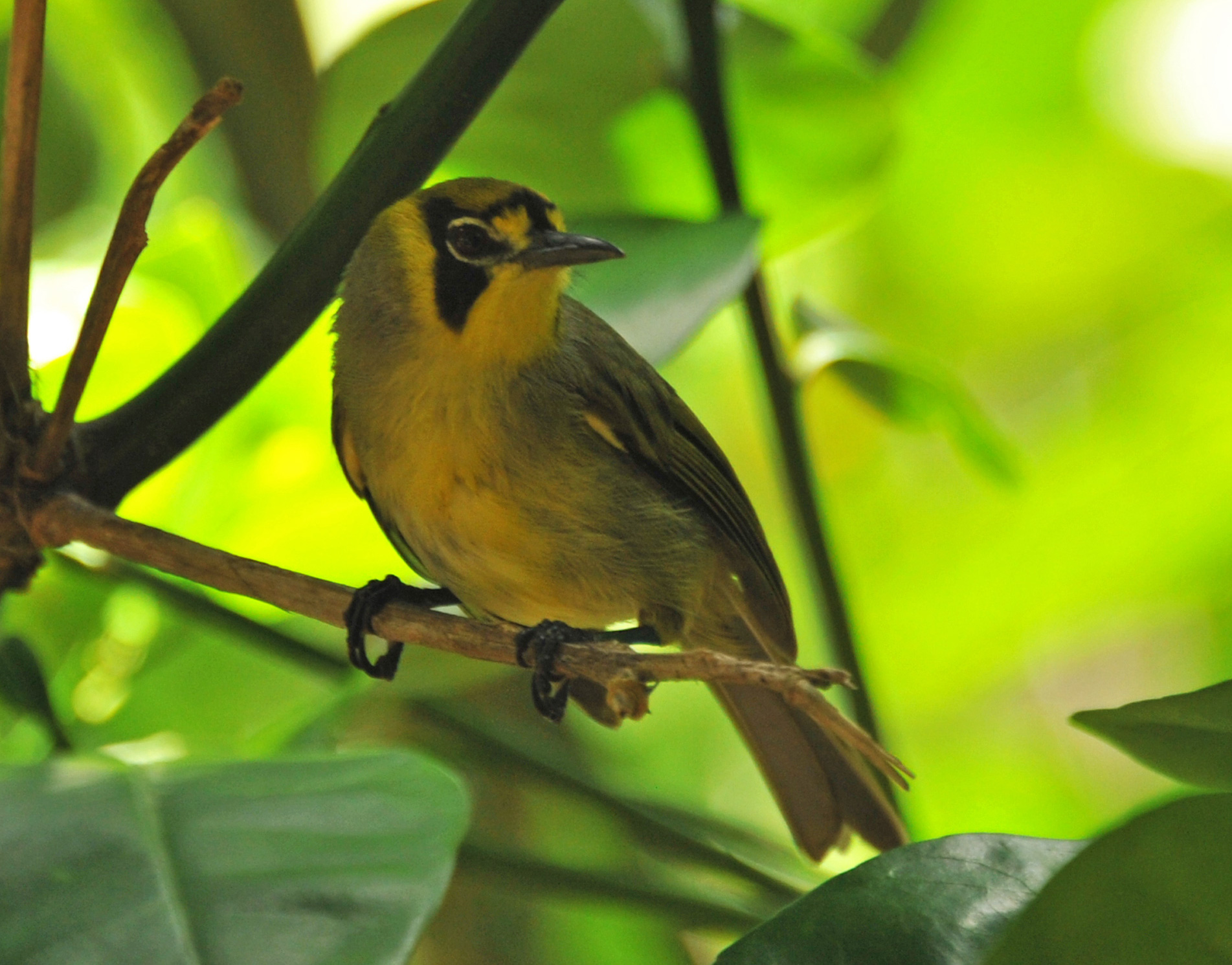

Conservation status
- Near Threatened (IUCN 3.1)

Scientific classification
- Kingdom: Animalia
- Phylum: Chordata
- Class: Aves
- Order: Passeriformes
- Family: Zosteropidae
- Genus: Apalopteron; Bonaparte, 1854
- Species: A. familiare

Binomial name
- Apalopteron familiare (Kittlitz, 1830)

= Bonin white-eye =

Small songbird endemic to the Bonin Islands of Japan

The Bonin white-eye (Apalopteron familiare) is a small species of songbird endemic to the Bonin Islands (Ogasawara Islands) of Japan. It is the only species in the monotypic genus Apalopteron. The taxonomic affinities of the Bonin white-eye were a long-standing mystery and it was formerly placed with the bulbuls, babblers and more recently with the honeyeaters, during which it was known as the Bonin honeyeater. Since 1995 it is known to be a white-eye in the family Zosteropidae, that is closely related to the golden white-eye of the Marianas Islands.

The Bonin white-eye has predominately yellow and green plumage and a conspicuous black triangular patch around the eye – the eye is also surrounded by a broken white ring. It was once found on all the major islands of the Bonin Islands but is now restricted to the islands of Hahajima. On that island group it is found in almost all the habitat types, native and human-modified, although it mostly breeds in native forest. Fruit is an important part of the diet, especially mulberries, as well as insects, but flowers, seeds, spiders and reptiles are taken as well. It feeds both in trees and on the ground, as it is more terrestrial than other white-eyes. Pairs of Bonin white-eyes form long-term pair bonds and remain together throughout the year. They nest in a cup-shaped nest into which usually two eggs are laid. Both parents are responsible for incubation and raising the chicks.

The arrival of humans in the Bonin Islands resulted in the extinction of many of the native birds of the islands. The Bonin white-eye was affected by the changes that caused those extinctions, and has lost one subspecies and is no longer found on many groups of the Bonin Islands. The species is an important part of the ecology of the Bonin Islands, an important seed disperser for the native plants. It has proven to be somewhat resilient to competition from introduced warbling white-eyes, predation by introduced rats and cats, and habitat loss. The Bonin white-eye is evaluated as being "near threatened" by the IUCN Red List of Threatened Species.

== Taxonomy ==
The Bonin white-eye was described by Heinrich von Kittlitz in 1830 based on specimens collected on Chichijima in the Bonin Islands. Kittlitz placed the species in the bulbul (family Pycnonotidae) genus Ixos. He gave the species the specific name familiare from the Latin for familiar or friendly, as the species was the first bird that visitors would encounter, much like the house sparrow in Europe. In 1854 Charles Lucien Bonaparte moved it to its own genus, Apalopteron. The name is derived from the Ancient Greek hapalos for delicate and ptilon for feather. Bonaparte also placed it with the Old World babblers, then a subgrouping (Timaliini) of an enlarged Old World warbler family (Sylviidae). Richard Bowdler Sharpe moved it back to the bulbul family in 1882, and placed it in the genus Pycnonotus. It was moved back to the babblers again by Jean Théodore Delacour in 1946, before Herbert Girton Deignan placed it with the Australasian honeyeaters (family Meliphagidae) in 1958, on the basis of tongue structure, bill shape, nest structure and a number of other morphological features.

The species remained with the honeyeaters for many decades, although some authors questioned the placement, especially as it was the only honeyeater in the North Pacific and there were no members of that family in the Philippines, the island group between that family's natural range and the Bonin Islands. Finn Salomonsen, writing in 1967, thought that the golden white-eye (Cleptornis marchei) of the Marianas Islands might be a close relative, and the species was then known as the golden honeyeater. Hiroyuki Morioka and Takaharu Sakane also attributed the species to the honeyeaters, but cautioned that this was a provisional placement as the structure of the tongue was not very different from that of babblers. They also noted that it was very similar in diet and habitat preferences to the warbling white-eye, which had been introduced and was coexisting with the Bonin white-eye.

The discovery that the golden white-eye was indeed a white-eye and not a honeyeater, based on behavioural observations by H. Douglas Pratt and the genetic research of Charles Sibley and Jon E. Ahlquist, was the impetus for the resolution of the Bonin white-eye's family placement. Sibley came to suspect that this meant that the Bonin white-eye had been similarly misassigned to the honeyeaters. Hiroyoshi Higuchi independently had reached the same conclusion, and so Higuchi and Keisuke Ueda obtained specimens for Sibley, who enlisted Mark S. Springer to analyse them using RNA sequencing. In 1995 they were able to show that it was indeed a white-eye (family Zosteropidae), and closely related to the golden white-eye and the white-eyes of the genus Rukia of Micronesia. The molecular evidence was supported by behavioural similarities to the white-eyes, such as the highly social allopreening and maintaining close contact when roosting.

There are two subspecies of Bonin white-eye, the extinct nominate, formerly found in Mukojima and Chichijima, and the southern subspecies, A. f. hahasima, of Hahajima.

== Description ==
The Bonin white-eye is 12 to 14 cm (4.7–5.5 in) long and weighs around 15 g (0.53 oz). The nominate race has a yellow head with a conspicuous triangular black eye-patch which is linked by the thin black line to a black forehead. The white eye-ring is broken by a thin black line through the eye. The lores are yellow, as are the throat and upper breast. The back and wings are olive-green tinged with grey, and the primaries are tinged with brown. The tail is olive-brown, and the underparts are pale yellow, with a grey wash on the flanks. The iris of the eye is brown, and the bill and legs are dark grey. The sexes are alike, and juveniles look very similar to the adults. The race hahasima is very similar to the nominate race, but the upperparts are tinged in yellowish-green tinge. It also has a slightly larger bill and tarsus.

Flight in this species is generally slow and direct, with fast sustained flight only being observed in chases between rivals. Aside from the chases, gliding and hopping were more common than flight, and individuals would usually climb trees by climbing branches and hopping; direct flights from the ground to the canopy are rare. The tarsus is long and the toes and claws are strong, especially compared to white-eyes in the genus Zosterops, reflecting its more terrestrial lifestyle. On the ground it hops rather than walks, in the manner of a thrush.

== Distribution and habitat ==
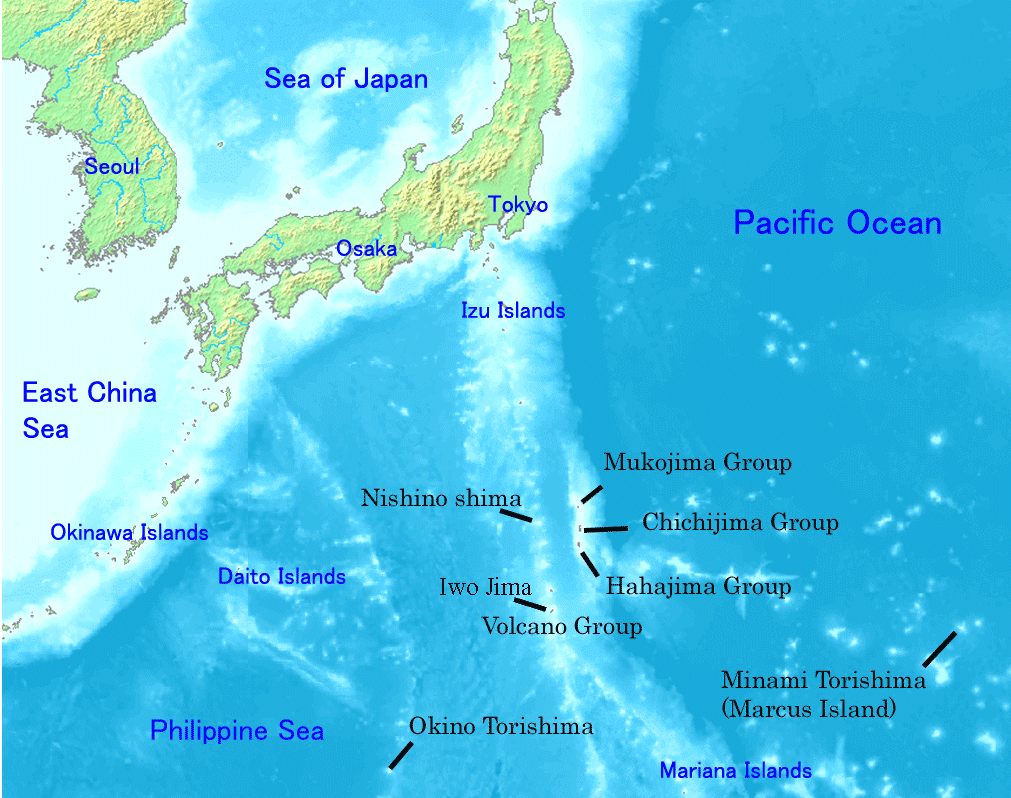
The Bonin white-eye lives in the Bonin Islands south of Japan

The Bonin white-eye is, at its name suggests, endemic to the Bonin Islands, south of Japan. The species was once found on all the major groups of islands in the chain, including the Mukojima Group, the Chichijima Group and the Hahajima. Presently its habitat is restricted to Hahajima Island and two nearby islands, having become extinct across the rest of its previous range. The species' presence on Chichijima Island has been the subject of debate and dispute. The species has been introduced to Chichijima from Hahajima, so it was assumed that all records related to that introduction, but its natural presence on the island, and subsequent extinction, was subsequently established from early accounts, and a bird from that island was the type specimen for the species. All records of the species in the Chichijima Group are from the main Chichijima Island.

On Hahajima, the only island on which its habitat preferences have been studied, the species occupies almost every habitat type. It occupies undisturbed native evergreen and broadleaf forest, dominated by Schima and Ardisia, as well as secondary and disturbed forest and other human modified habitats. The species occupies a wide range of modified habitats during the non-breeding season, but is more localised when breeding, when it is predominantly found in undisturbed native forest with large trees and bamboo, tree ferns and large shrubs. It is much rarer on the windy ridges of the mountains, where the vegetation is short and shrubby. Local fishermen on Hahajima have reported that the species disperses to the smaller islands of the group during the autumn and winter, but these localised movements have not been confirmed.

== Behaviour ==
=== Vocalisations ===
The Bonin white-eye was long thought to be an infrequent songster. Early accounts reported no singing from captive birds, and a report published in 1985 noted that while it did sing, it did so very irregularly. The same report concluded that the species did not use its call for territorial defence. Subsequent research found that the species does indeed sing regularly, but does so very early in the morning, just before dawn, and then only rarely during the rest of the day. The function of the song is considered more likely related to territorial defence. Around 90% of paired and territory-holding males sing, along with some unpaired males, making the morning song a convenient tool to survey the species. The song itself is melodious and has been compared to that of a bunting or a Siberian blue robin, and is a chew-i, chit-chit-pee, chot-chot-pee, ch-ee or tu-ti-ti, ti-titu-tuoo.

The species makes a variety of other calls as well. It frequently makes a fe-ee contact call, as well as ch-ee or chit alarm calls, and a scolding kyok call, made when observers came too close to the nest. The male also makes a ze-ze-ze call during courtship feeding.

=== Diet and feeding ===
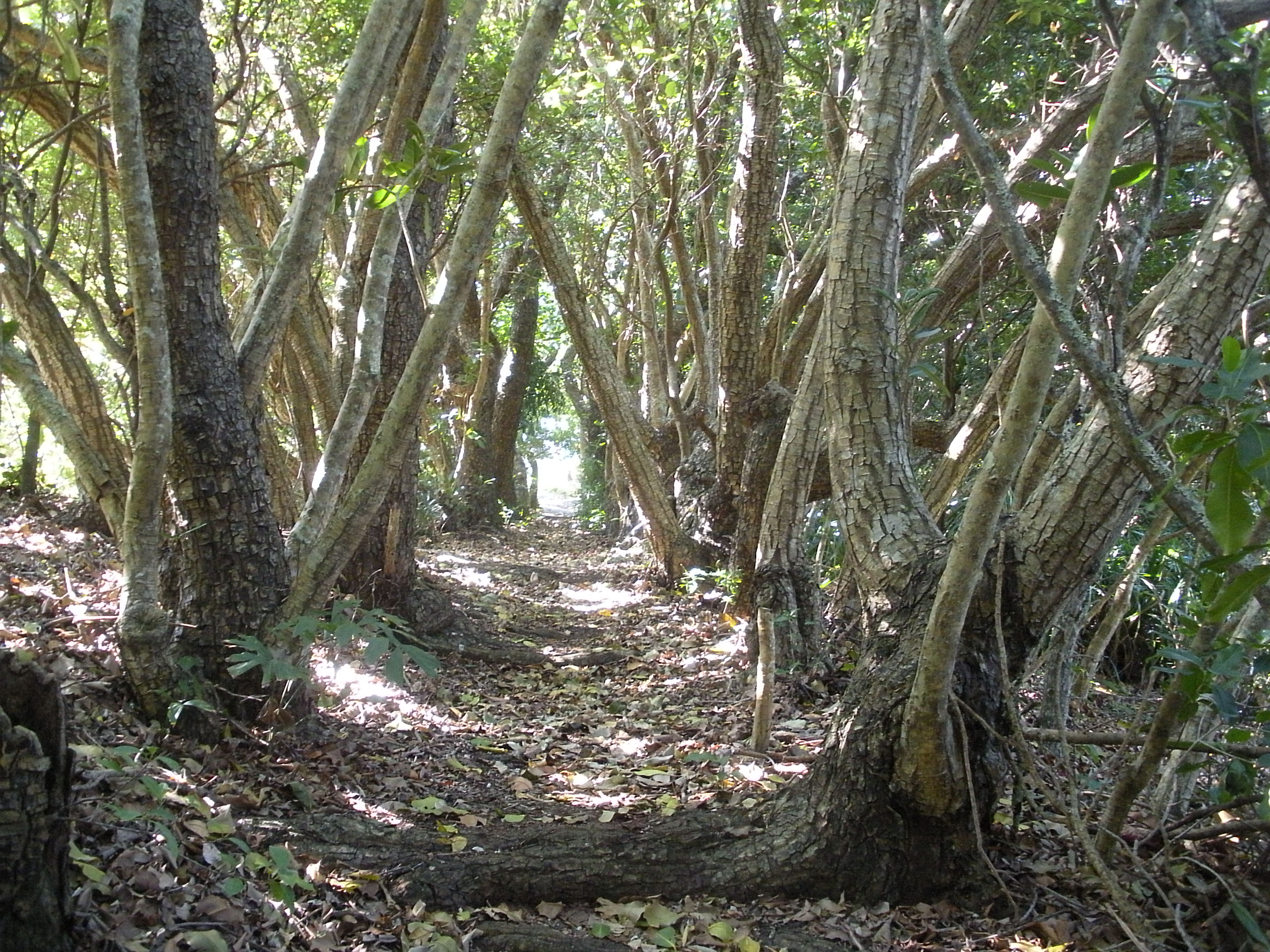
Calophyllum inophyllum, on Hahajima, the fruit of which are part of the diet of the Bonin white-eye

The Bonin white-eye has a diet that includes a range of fruit, flowers and insects. The species feeds in a wide range of niches, both arboreal and terrestrial, and has evolved to do so. Hiroyuki suggested that its morphology and feeding habits evolved in the lack of competition, as the Bonin Islands are species poor in terms of birds. Feeding niches vary somewhat by season, as it feeds less frequently on the ground in the breeding season.

Fruit, seeds, flowers and nectar forms around half the diet based on direct observation, with the species observed feeding on 15 species of plant. Endemic mulberries (Morus boninensis) are a favoured food, but a range of fruits and flowers are fed on, both species native to the island and introduced. Among the natives fed on other than mulberries are Rhaphiolepis, Leucaena, and Solanum nigrum. Introduced plants fed on include bananas, papaya, Lantana, Cucurbita moschata (or squash) and Calophyllum inophyllum. The Bonin white-eye does take some nectar but the extent to which it is an important food is unknown; observations on Hahajima showed it fed from flowers far less frequently than the warbling white-eye.

In addition to plant food, insect and other invertebrate prey is taken as well. Insects found in the stomachs of Bonin white-eyes include beetles, lacewings, true bugs, and ants. They have also been observed taking caterpillars, crickets, and flies. Non-insect prey includes spiders and even small reptiles.

=== Breeding ===
The breeding behaviour of the Bonin white-eye has not been extensively studied. The main breeding season is between March and June with a peak in May. It is thought that the species forms long term pair bonds with partners remaining close throughout the year, as roosting birds typically do so in pairs. They typically place the nest in a fork in a tree (typically Shima, but other trees may be used including introduced species) between 1–12 m (3.3–39.4 ft) off the ground, with the average height being 6 m (20 ft), but in one case a nest has been found in a cavity inside a tree. Both parents are responsible for building the nest, which is a deep and crudely shaped cup. The nest is mostly made from Pandanus fibres, with vines, grasses, pine needles and rootlets woven in, and the outside is lined with dead leaves. Slightly finer material is used to line the inside of the nest.

The eggs of the Bonin white-eye measure 19.5–20.5 mm × 15–15.8 mm (0.77–0.81 in × 0.59–0.62 in) and are greenish-blue spotted and blotched with brown. The usual clutch size is around two eggs, which is a small clutch for a Japanese bird. Both parents incubate the eggs for just under two weeks and feed the chicks for a month after fledging.

== Ecology ==
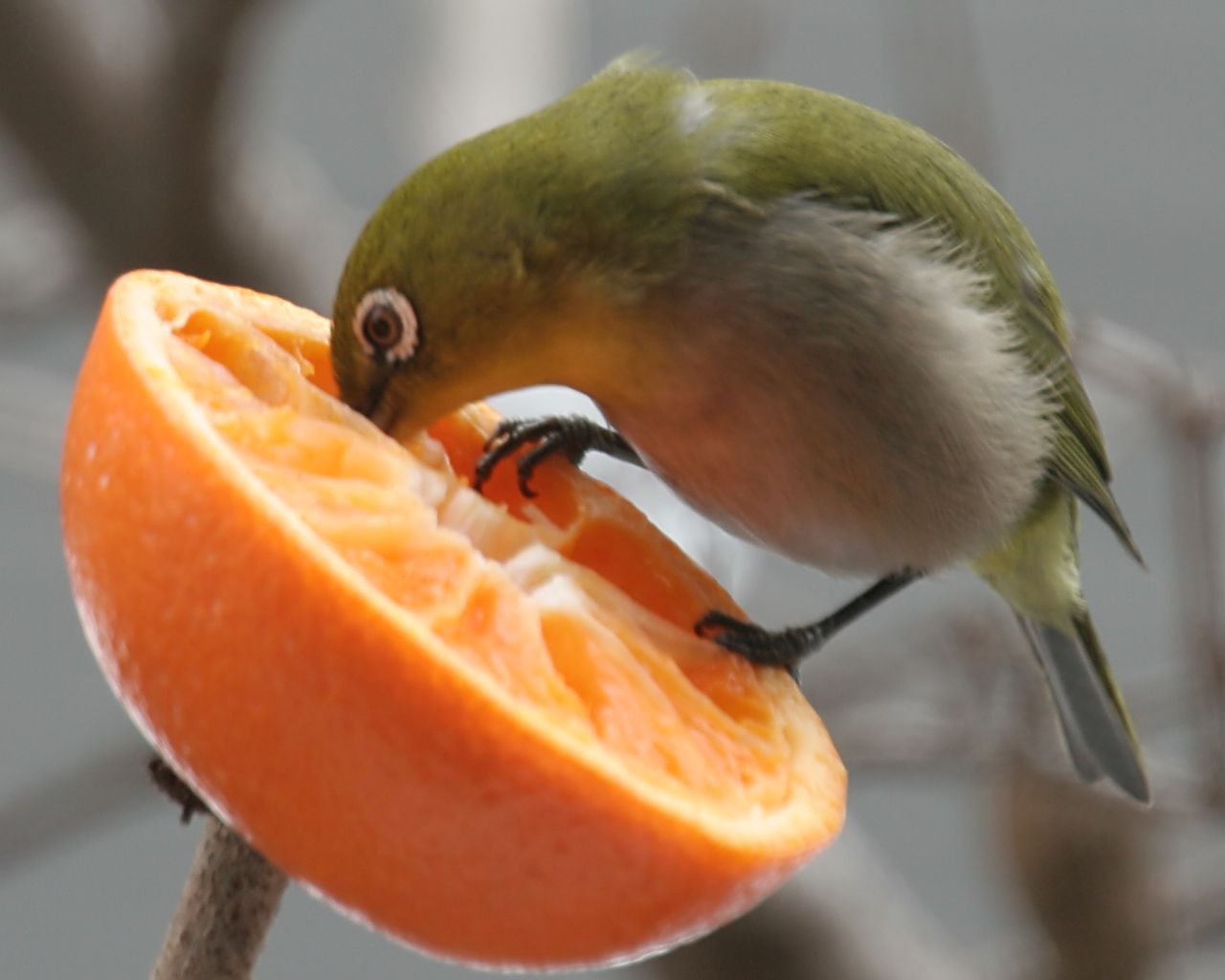
The Bonin white-eye can learn to feed on new food items by observing the warbling white-eye doing so.

The introduction of warbling white-eyes led to some concerns that it would compete with the Bonin white-eye in a harmful way. Studies of the interactions of the two species has shown that this has not been the case, possibly because of differences in morphology. The Bonin white-eye does show some changes in feeding niches in the presence of the warbling white-eye, feeding lower down in the canopy when the warbling white-eye is present, but its population, food selection, or the size of its chicks have not been affected. Juvenile Bonin white-eyes join warbling white-eyes and brown-eared bulbuls in mixed species feeding flocks in the non-breeding season. Brown-eared bulbuls may sometimes take Bonin white-eye eggs.

Warbling white-eyes may have had some effect on the behaviour of Bonin white-eyes, having potentially taught the Bonin white-eye about new foods in the human-altered Bonin Islands. This ability to learn about new foods from the warbling white-eye was shown by establishing food stations on the island baited with a novel food item, tinned peaches. When first presented with the new food item, it was avoided by the Bonin white-eyes. Where Bonin white-eyes could watch warbling white-eyes feeding on the peaches they began to feed on them as well, but where warbling white-eyes were not around and could not be watched they did not do so.

The Bonin white-eye is an important seed disperser in the Bonin Islands, helping to maintain healthy forests. The islands have few species of birds, particularly after the loss of several endemic species to extinction since the arrival of humans, such as the Bonin wood pigeon and Bonin thrush. In a study of native and introduced birds on the islands, it was one of the three most important seed dispersers, along with the brown-eared bulbul and warbling white-eye.

== Status and conservation ==
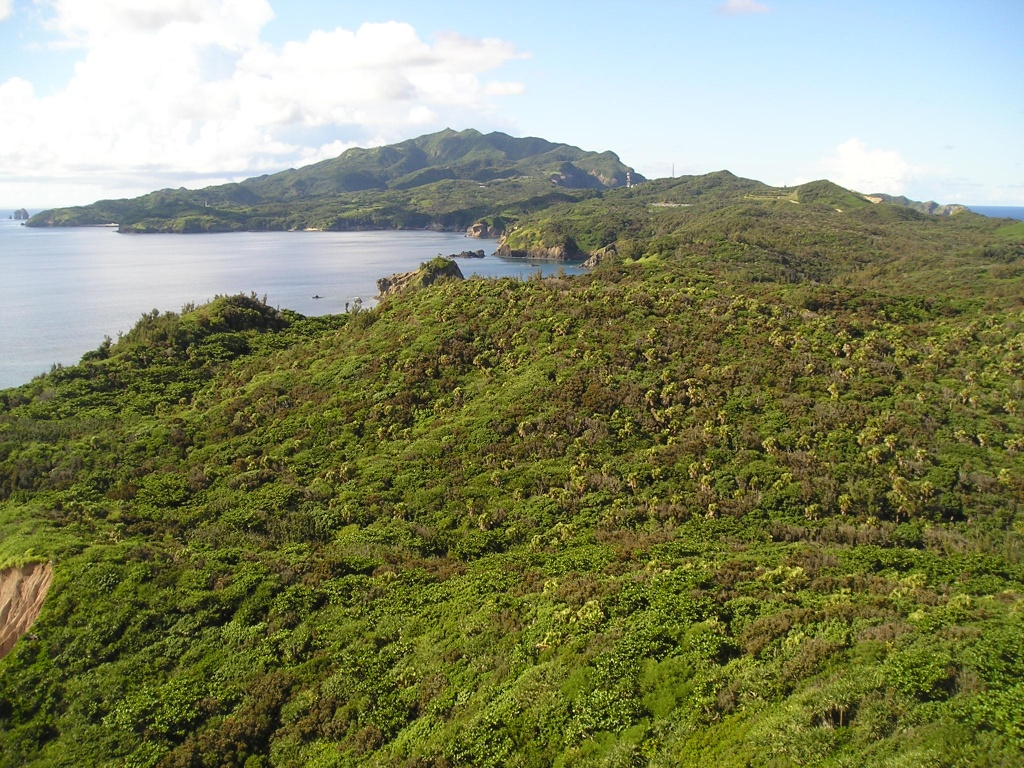
The Bonin Islands (Hahajima pictured) have been protected to preserve the species

The Bonin white-eye is evaluated as being "near threatened" by the IUCN Red List. The nominate race, of Mukojima and Chichijima is thought to be extinct. Its current status on Chichijima is uncertain, and it was reintroduced there and may have persisted, although a 2003 study of the species found none there. The reasons for its extinction on these two islands are unknown. It is thought that habitat loss, specifically the clearance of primary forest, may be a cause.

The species' status on Hahajima seems more secure. It was considered vulnerable, as population estimates put the number of birds on the island at around 4,000. More accurate censusing, which took into account both densities of birds and how they varied by habitat, re-estimated the population at over 15,000. The same study evaluated that the species was not in immediate threat of extinction. On the basis of the study it was downlisted to near threatened in 2013. The species is preyed upon by introduced cats; it is particularly vulnerable due to its tendency to feed on the ground, and its nests are raided by introduced rats. It is also somewhat threatened by the loss of native forest, for agriculture and tourism. Overall however the species is resilient to some degree to habitat modification, introduced predators and competitors, and its population is thought to be stable. It remains listed as near threatened, in spite of the stable population, due to a susceptibility to extreme weather events which could decimate the species.

The Bonin white-eye is protected under Japanese law as a National Endangered Species. The Bonin Islands have been designated a National Wildlife Protection Area, in part to help protect this species. Efforts are underway to remove cats and rats from the islands, as well as remove invasive trees and restore native trees. Conservationists have suggested that regular monitoring of the species be started and the feasibility of translocating birds to islands they have been lost from to create more populations and lessen the risk of a single incident wiping the species out.

== See also ==
- List of Special Places of Scenic Beauty, Special Historic Sites and Special Natural Monuments
