= Kita-Sakado Station =

Railway station in Sakado, Saitama Prefecture, Japan

TJ27 Kita-Sakado Station 北坂戸駅
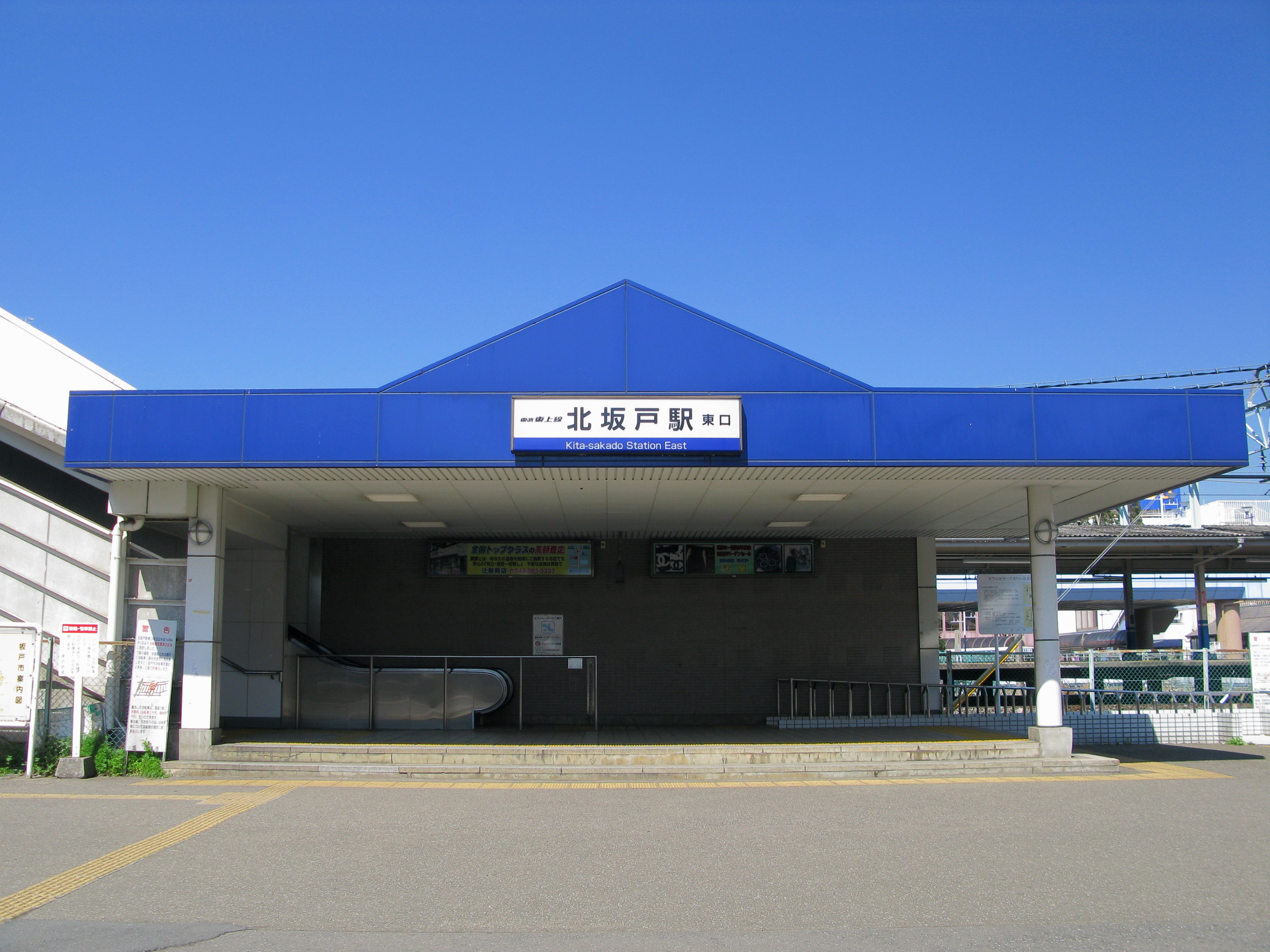
- Kita-Sakado Station east entrance in March 2012

General information
- Location: 1 Hirosuechō, Sakado-shi, Saitama-ken 350-0272; Japan
- Coordinates: 35°58′20″N 139°23′49″E
- Operator: Tōbu Railway
- Line: Tōbu Tōjō Line
- Distance: 42.7 km from Ikebukuro
- Platforms: 1 island platform
- Tracks: 2
- Connections: Bus stop

Other information
- Station code: TJ-27
- Website: Official website

History
- Opened: 21 August 1973

Passengers
- FY2019: 20,020 daily

Services
Preceding station	Tobu Railway	Following station
Takasaka TJ28 towards Ogawamachi	F Liner	Sakado TJ26 towards Motomachi-Chūkagai
Takasaka TJ28 towards Yorii	Tojo Line Rapid Express Express Semi Express Local	Sakado TJ26 towards Ikebukuro
Location
- Location within Saitama Prefecture Location within Japan

Kita-Sakado Station (北坂戸駅, Kitasakado-eki) is a passenger railway station located in the city of Sakado, Saitama, Japan, operated by the private railway operator Tōbu Railway.

== Lines ==
Kita-Sakado Station is served by the Tōbu Tōjō Line from Ikebukuro in Tokyo. Located between Sakado and Takasaka, it is 42.7 km from the Ikebukuro terminus. Rapid Express, Express, Semi Express, and Local services stop at this station. During the daytime, the station is served by six trains per hour in each direction.

== Station layout ==
The station consists of a single island platform serving two tracks. The station building is located above the platforms.

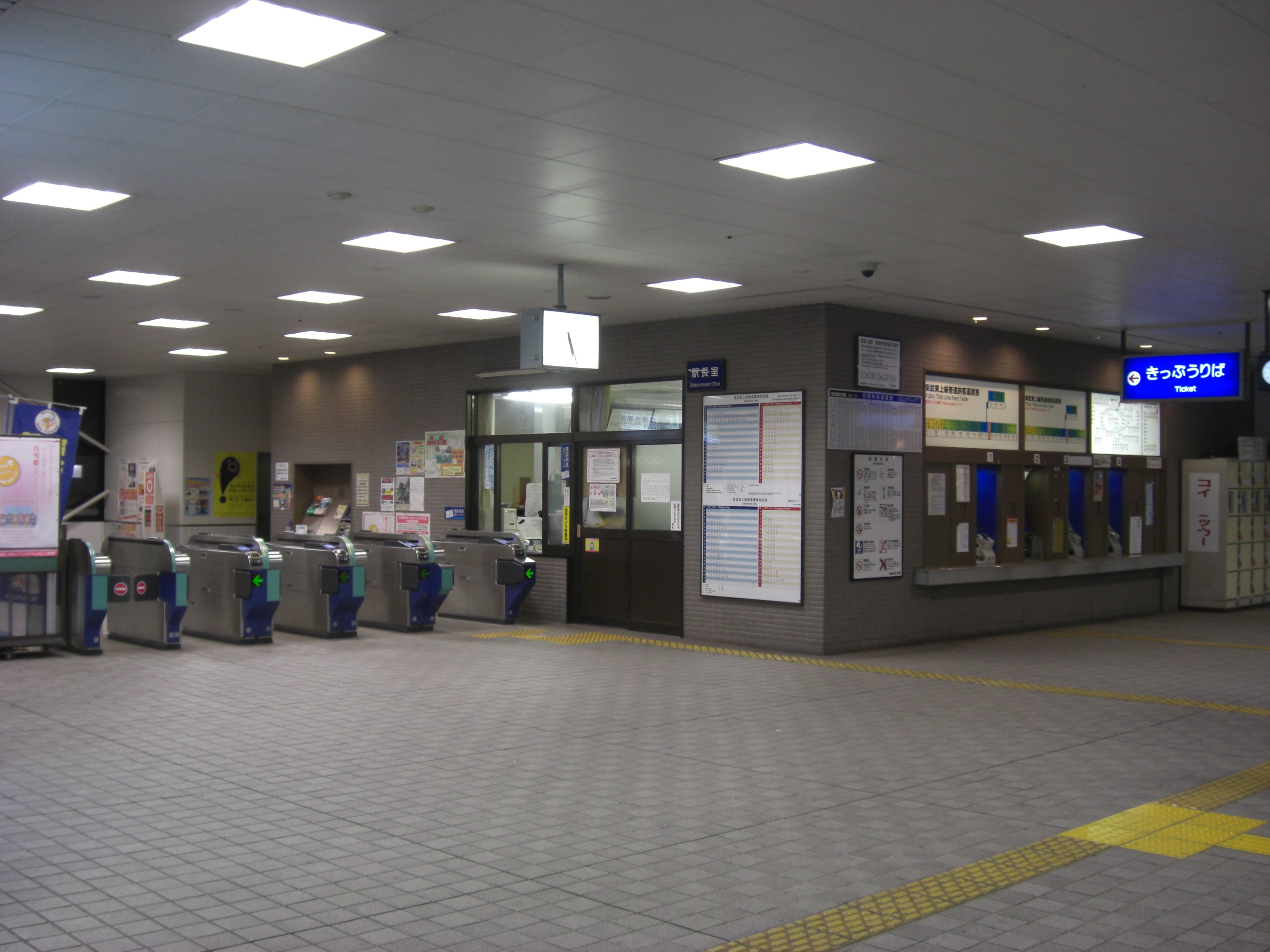
The ticket barriers in November 2008

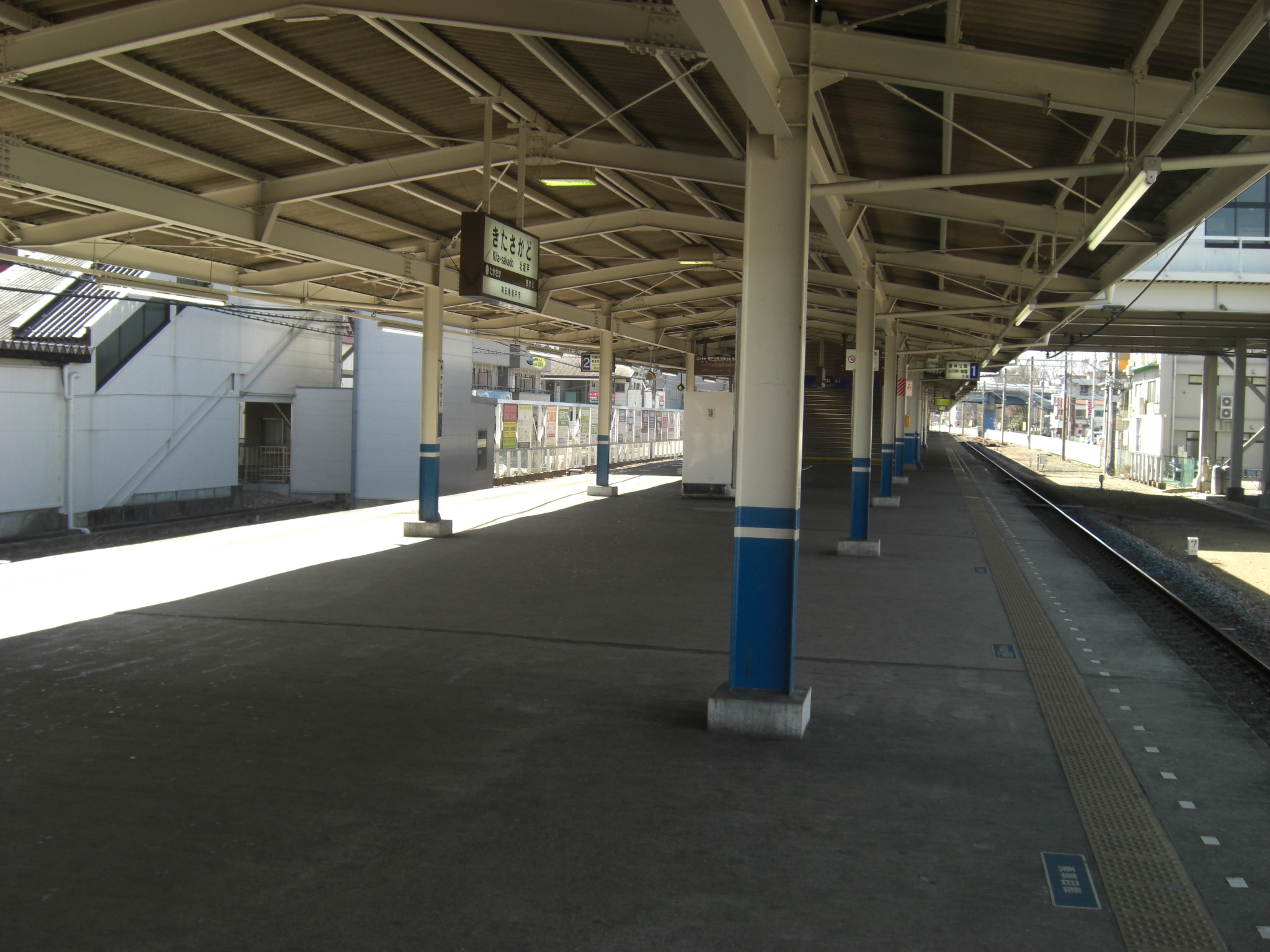
View of the platforms in March 2008

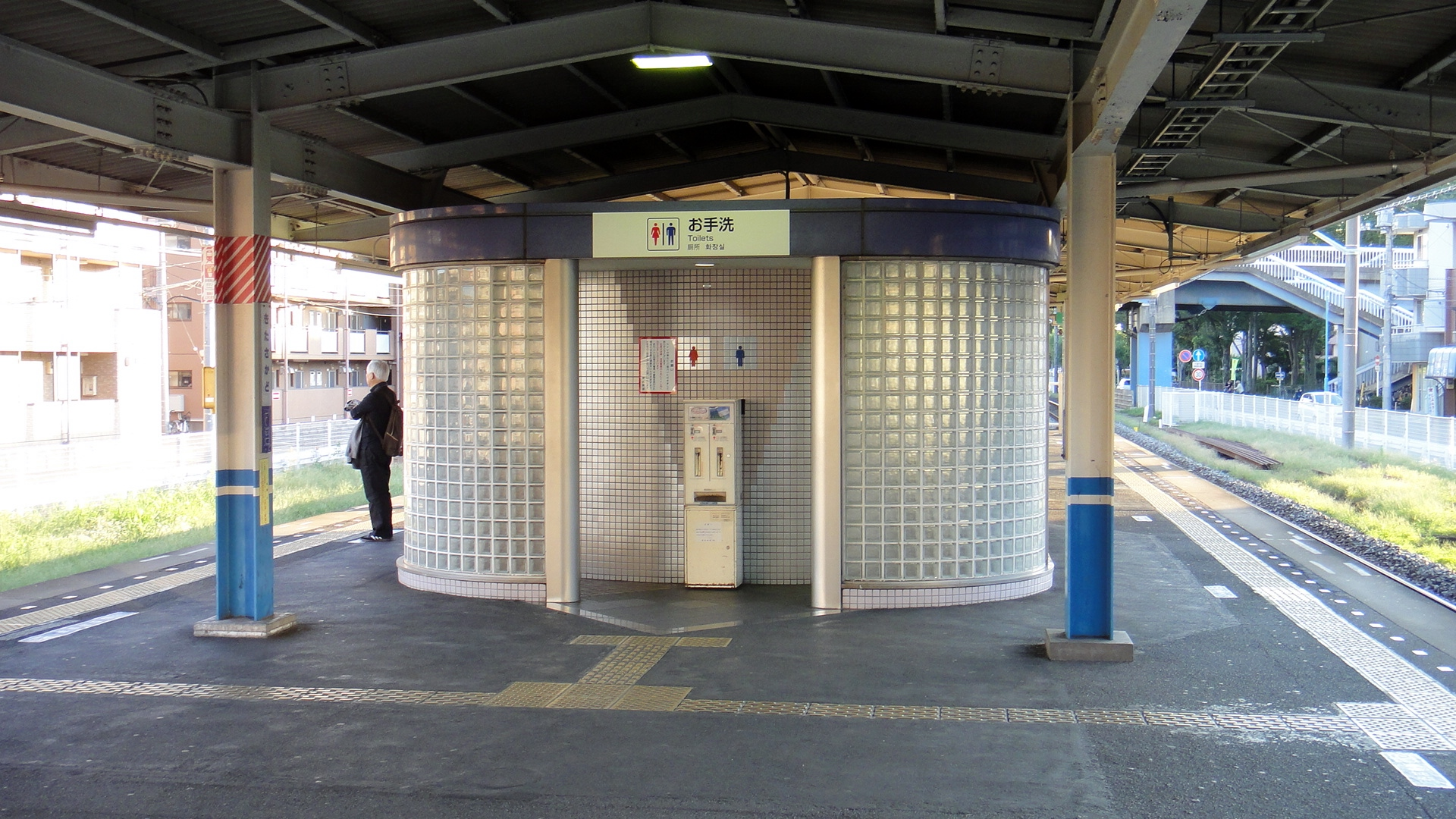
The toilet block at the south end of the platform in September 2013

=== Platforms ===
1	Tōbu Tōjō Line	for Higashi-Matsuyama, Shinrin-kōen, and Ogawamachi
2	Tōbu Tōjō Line	for Sakado, Kawagoe, and Ikebukuro; Tokyo Metro Yurakucho Line for Shin-Kiba; Tokyo Metro Fukutoshin Line for Shibuya; Tōkyū Tōyoko Line for Hiyoshi and Yokohama; Tōkyū Shin-Yokohama Line for Shin-Yokohama via Sōtetsu Shin-Yokohama Line for Shōnandai; Minatomirai Line for Motomachi-Chūkagai

== History ==
The station opened on 21 August 1973. From 17 March 2012, station numbering was introduced on the Tobu Tojo Line, with Kita-Sakado Station becoming "TJ-27".

Through running to and from Shin-Yokohama and Shōnandai via the Tōkyū Shin-yokohama Line, Sōtetsu Shin-yokohama Line, Sōtetsu Main Line, and Sōtetsu Izumino Line commenced on 18 March 2023.

== Passenger statistics ==
In fiscal 2019, the station was used by an average of 20,020 passengers daily.

== Surrounding area ==
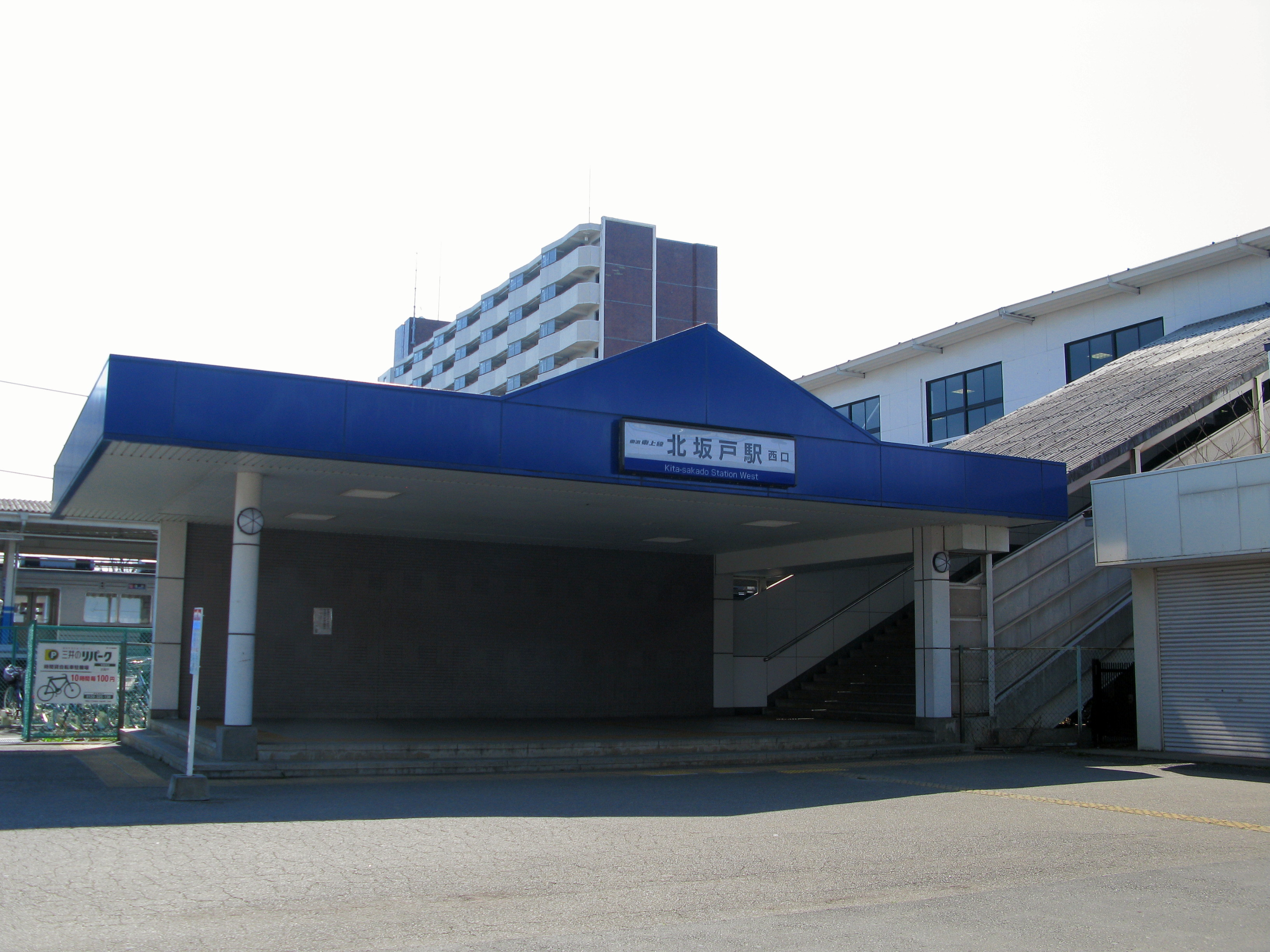
The west entrance in March 2012

=== Civic ===
- "Orumo" Sakado Civic Culture Centre

=== Education ===
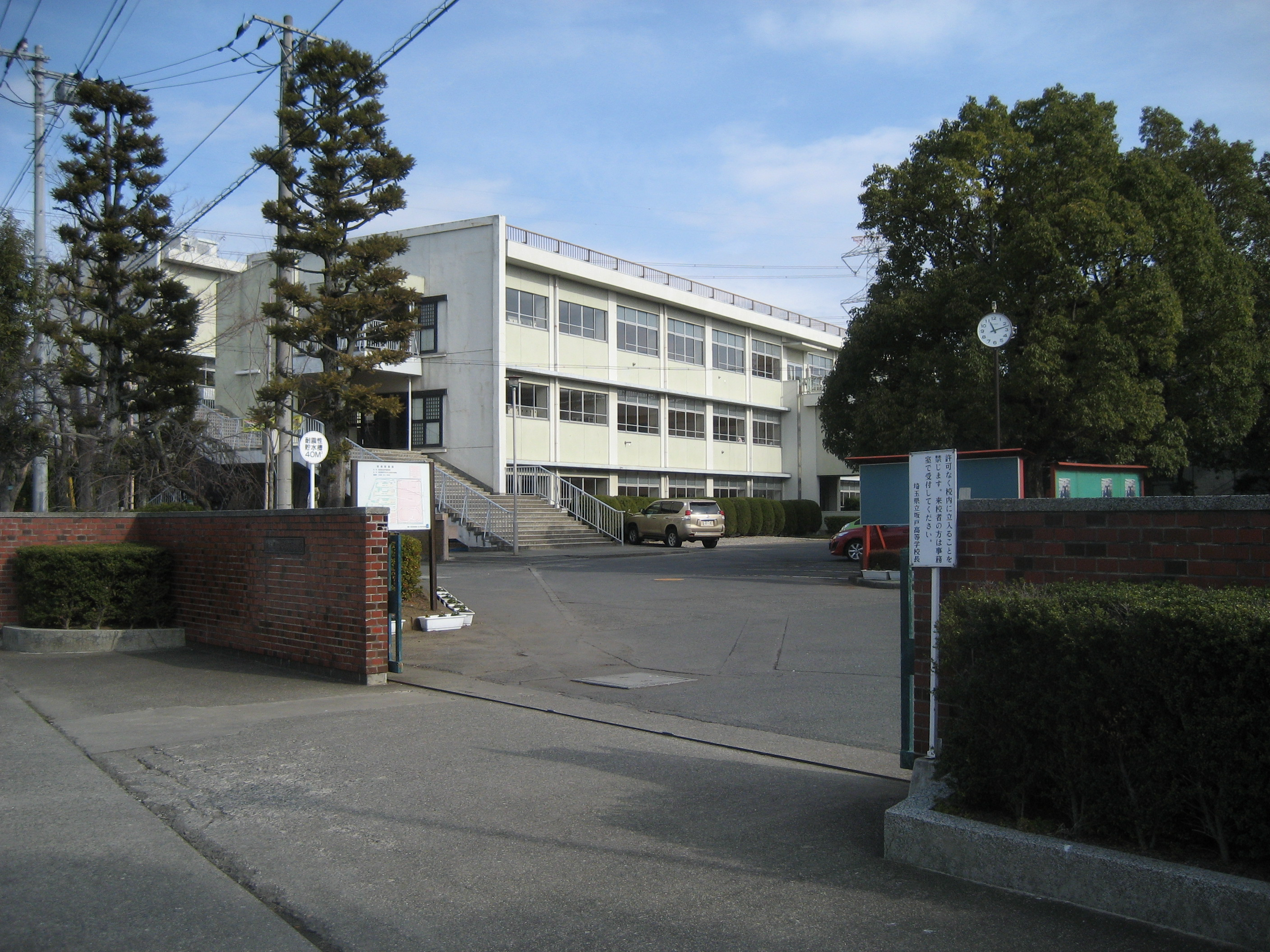
The main entrance of Sakado High School

- Sakado School for the Deaf
- Saitama Prefectural Sakado High School
- Sakura Junior High School
- Sakado Elementary School
- Kita-Sakado Elementary School

=== Rivers ===
- Oppegawa River
- Komagawa River

== Bus services ==
The east side of the station is served by the "Sakacchi Bus" (Ōya Line) and "Sakacchi Wagon" (Maguro Line & Shigaichi Line) community minibus services operated by the city of Sakado.

== See also ==
- List of railway stations in Japan
