= Takasaka Station =

Railway station in Higashimatsuyama, Saitama Prefecture, Japan

TJ28 Takasaka Station 高坂駅
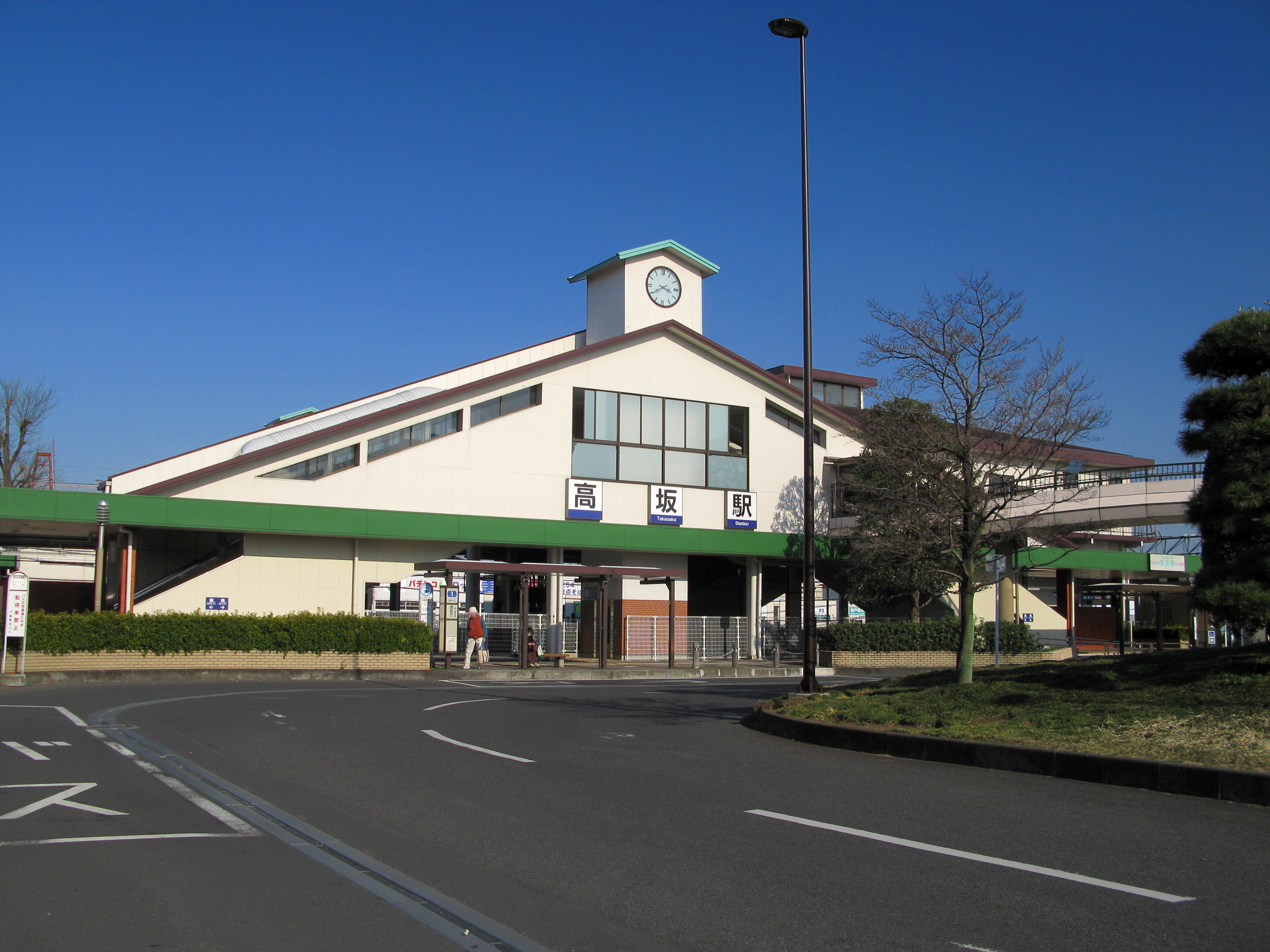
- The west entrance in March 2012

General information
- Location: 1333-2 Takasaka, Higashimatsuyama-shi, Saitama-ken 355-0047; Japan
- Coordinates: 36.0026°N 139.3979°E
- Operator: Tōbu Railway
- Line: Tōbu Tōjō Line
- Distance: 46.2 km from Ikebukuro
- Platforms: 1 island platform
- Tracks: 2
- Connections: Bus stop

Other information
- Station code: TJ-28
- Website: Official website

History
- Opened: 1 October 1923

Passengers
- FY2019: 24,438 daily

Services
Preceding station	Tobu Railway	Following station
Higashi-Matsuyama TJ29 towards Ogawamachi	F Liner	Kita-Sakado TJ27 towards Motomachi-Chūkagai
Higashi-Matsuyama TJ29 towards Yorii	Tojo Line Rapid Express Express Semi Express Local	Kita-Sakado TJ27 towards Ikebukuro
Location
- Location within Saitama Prefecture Location within Japan

Takasaka Station (高坂駅, Takasaka-eki) is a passenger railway station located in the city of Higashimatsuyama, Saitama, Japan, operated by the private railway operator Tōbu Railway.

== Lines ==
Takasaka Station is served by the Tōbu Tōjō Line from Ikebukuro in Tokyo. Located between Kita-Sakado and Higashi-Matsuyama, it is 46.2 km from the Ikebukuro terminus. Rapid Express, Express, Semi Express, and Local services stop at this station. During the daytime, the station is served by six trains per hour in each direction.

== Station layout ==
The station consists of an island platform serving two tracks, with the station building located above the platforms.

=== Platforms ===
1	■ Tōbu Tōjō Line	for Higashi-Matsuyama, Shinrinkōen, Ogawamachi, and Yorii
2	■ Tōbu Tōjō Line	for Sakado, Kawagoe, and Ikebukuro; Tokyo Metro Yurakucho Line for Shin-Kiba; Tokyo Metro Fukutoshin Line for Shibuya; Tōkyū Tōyoko Line for Hiyoshi and Yokohama; Tōkyū Shin-Yokohama Line for Shin-Yokohama via Sōtetsu Shin-Yokohama Line for Shōnandai; Minatomirai Line for Motomachi-Chukagai

=== Facilities and accessibility ===
A waiting room is provided on the platform. Universal access toilets are located in the station building. Escalators and lifts are provided in addition to steps to the station and platforms.

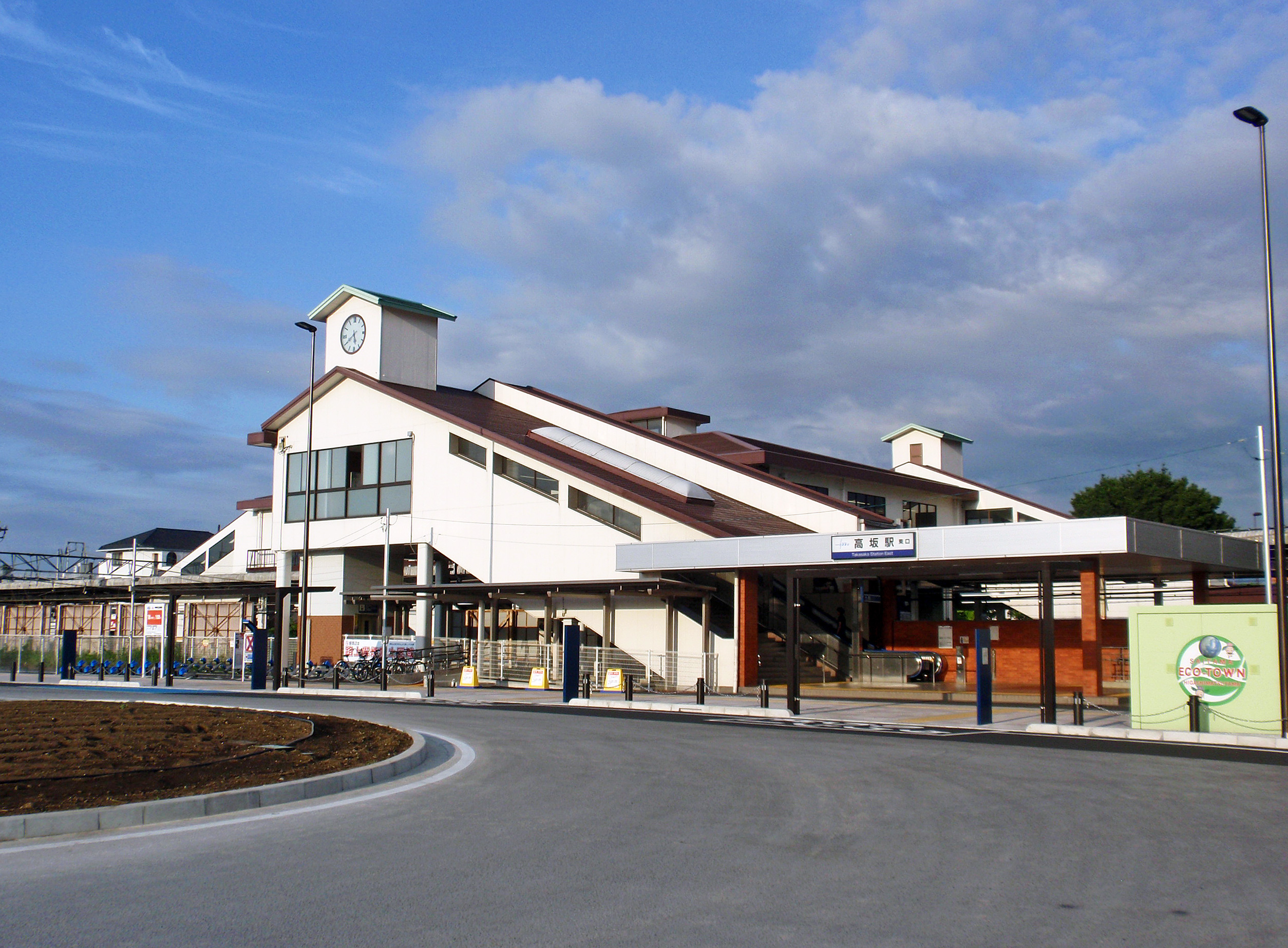
East exit, June 2019

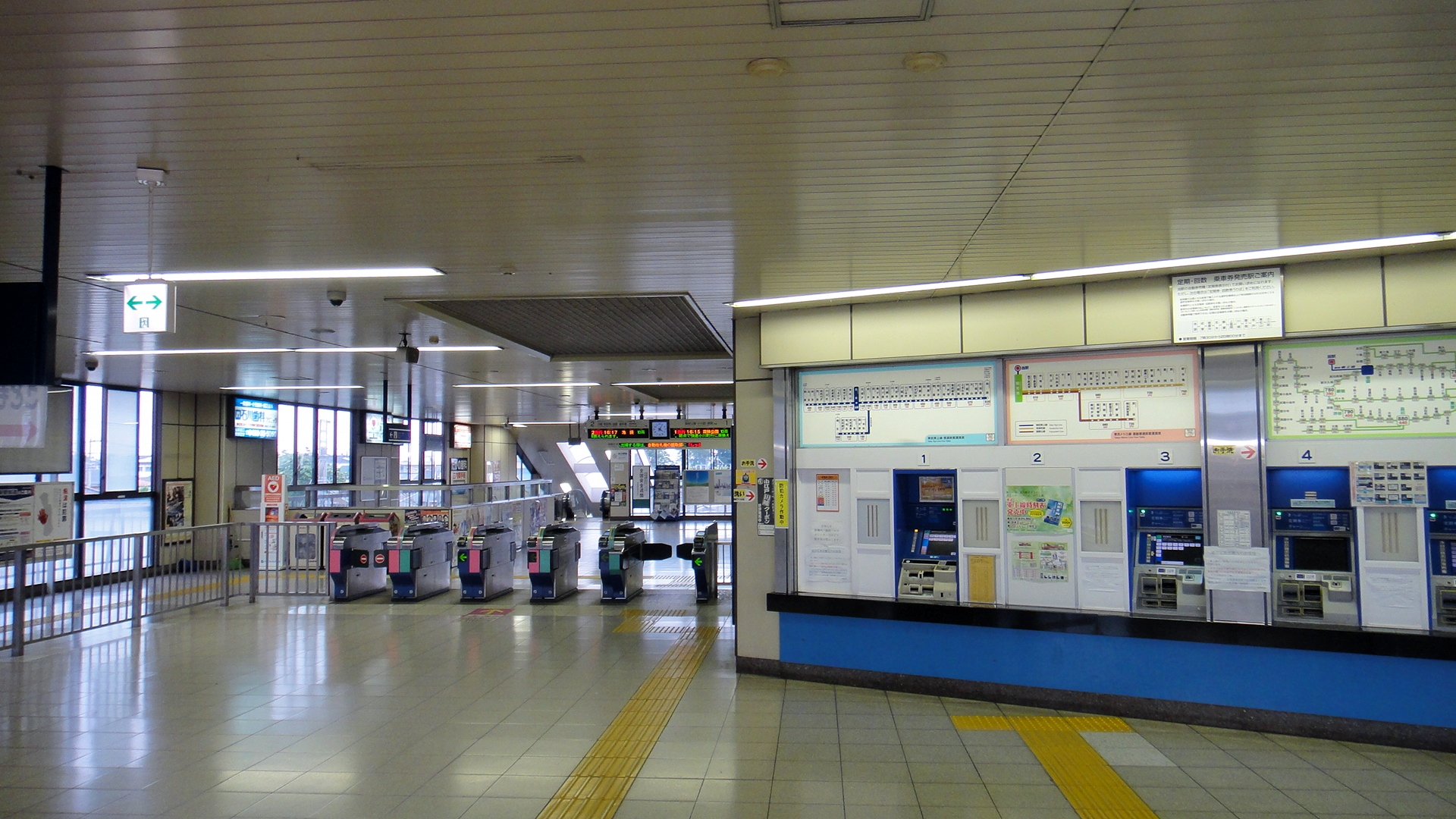
The ticket vending machines and ticket barriers in June 2013

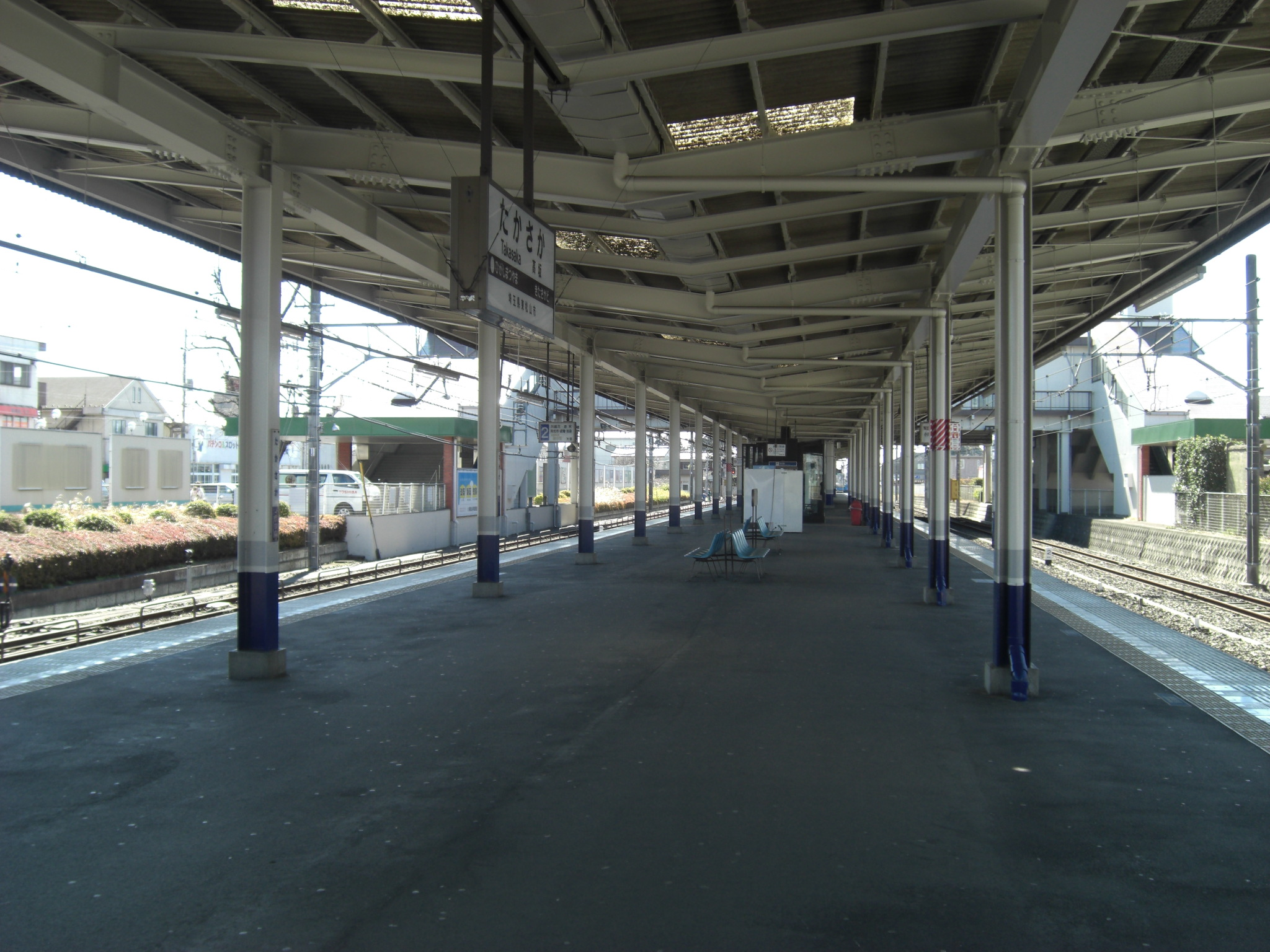
View of the platforms, looking toward Ikebukuro in March 2008

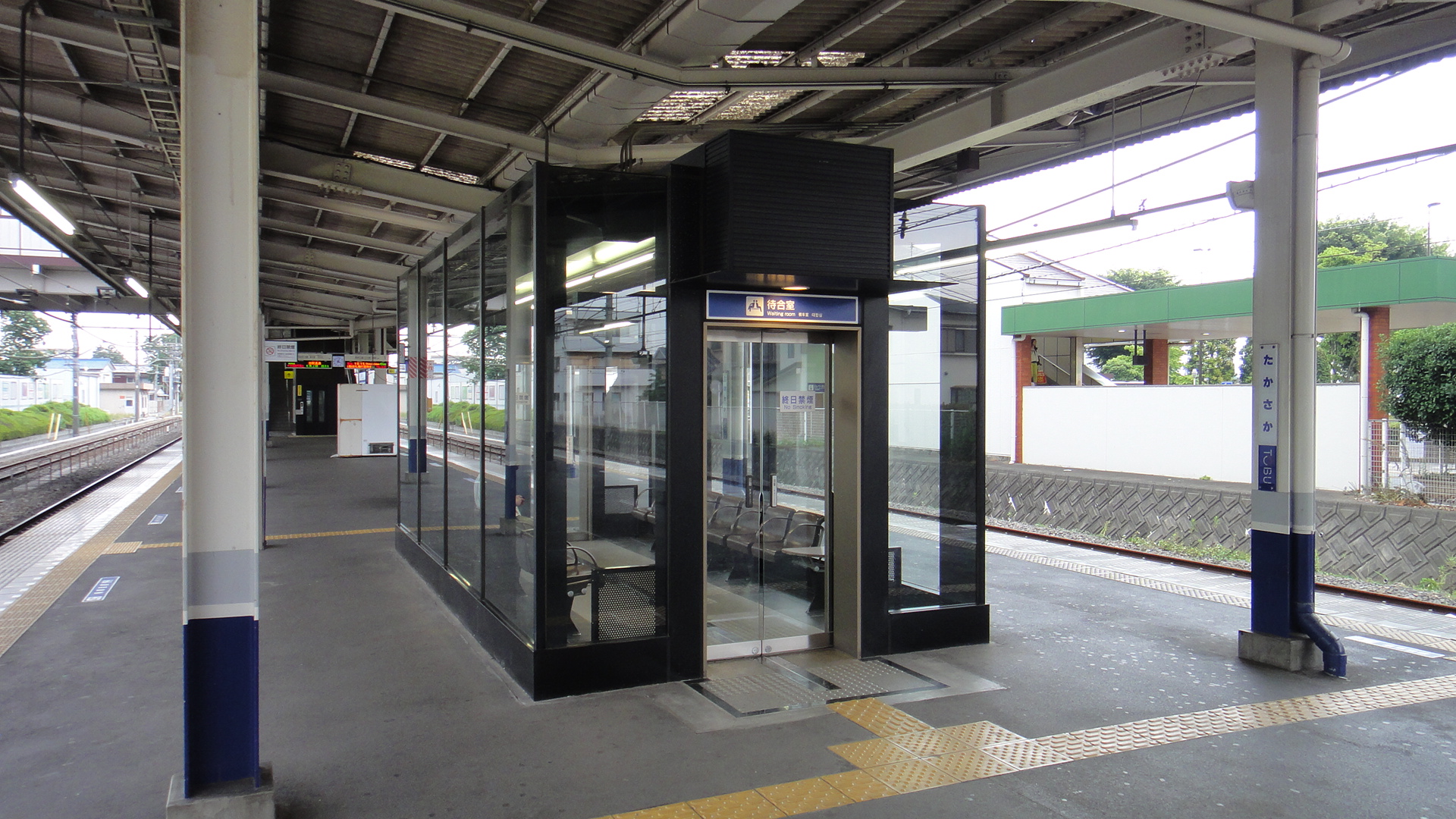
The passenger waiting room on the platform in June 2013

== History ==
The station opened on 1 October 1923.

From 17 March 2012, station numbering was introduced on the Tōbu Tōjō Line, with Takasaka Station becoming "TJ-28".

Through running to and from Shin-Yokohama and Shōnandai via the Tōkyū Shin-yokohama Line, Sōtetsu Shin-yokohama Line, Sōtetsu Main Line, and Sōtetsu Izumino Line commenced on 18 March 2023. In addition, Rapid Express services now stop at Takasaka.

== Passenger statistics ==
In fiscal 2019, the station was used by an average of 24,438 passengers daily.

== Surrounding area ==
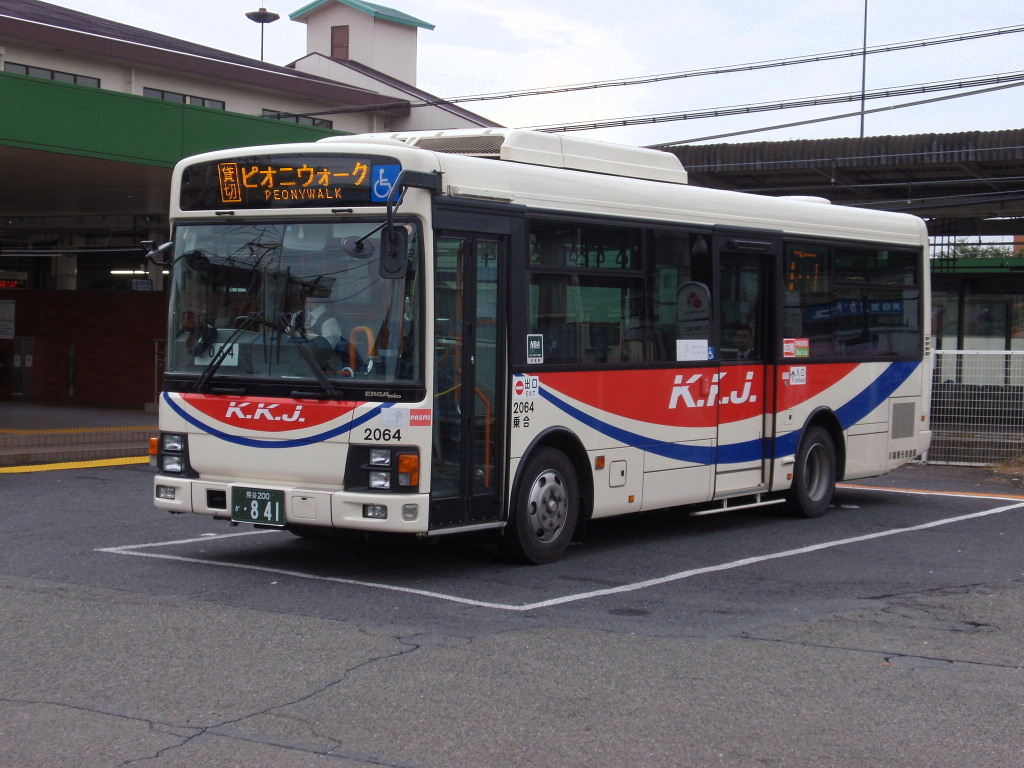
The shuttle bus for Peony Walk shopping mall in October 2010

A large out-of-town shopping mall, Peony Walk, is located approximately 1 km from Takasaka Station.

- Takasaka New Town
- Tokigawa River
- Tokigawa Riverside Park

== See also ==
- List of railway stations in Japan
