= Higashi-Matsuyama Station =

Railway station in Higashimatsuyama, Saitama Prefecture, Japan

TJ29 Higashi-Matsuyama Station 東松山駅
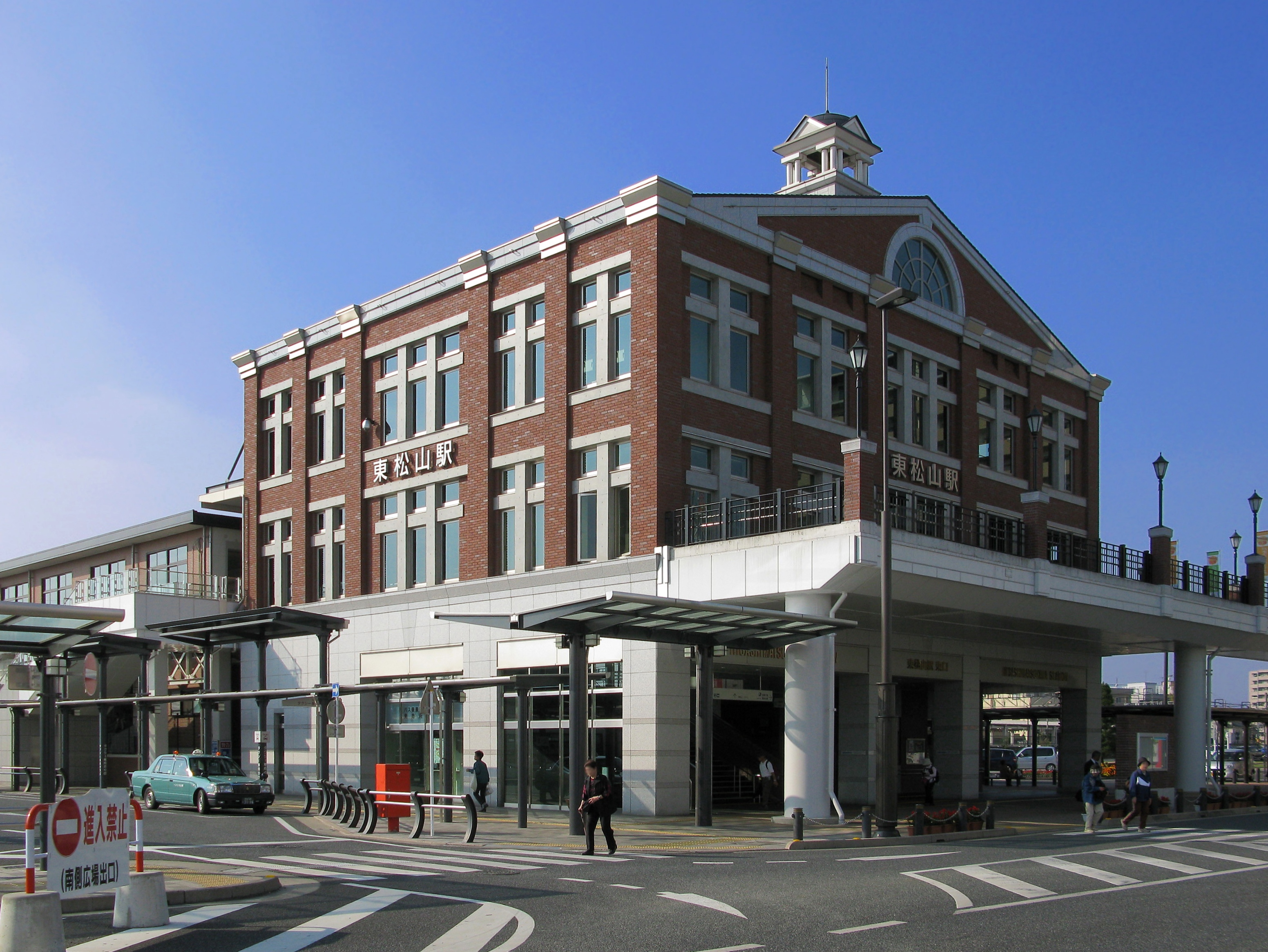
- The east entrance in November 2011

General information
- Location: 1-12-11 Yakyū-chō, Higashimatsuyama-shi, Saitama-ken 355–0028; Japan
- Coordinates: 36.034909°N 139.401658°E
- Operator: Tōbu Railway
- Line: Tōbu Tōjō Line
- Distance: 49.9 km from Ikebukuro
- Platforms: 2 side platforms
- Tracks: 2
- Connections: Bus terminal

Construction
- Structure type: At-grade
- Accessible: Yes

Other information
- Station code: TJ-29
- Website: Official website

History
- Opened: 1 October 1923
- Rebuilt: 2010
- Former names: Bushū Matsuyama (until 1954)

Passengers
- FY2019: 28,778 daily

Services
Preceding station	Tobu Railway	Following station
Shinrin-kōen TJ30 towards Ogawamachi	TJ Liner	Sakado TJ26 towards Ikebukuro
Shinrin-kōen TJ30 towards Ogawamachi	Kawagoe	Sakado TJ26 towards Ikebukuro
Shinrin-kōen TJ30 towards Ogawamachi	F Liner	Takasaka TJ28 towards Motomachi-Chūkagai
Shinrin-kōen TJ30 towards Yorii	Tojo Line Rapid Express Express Semi Express Local	Takasaka TJ28 towards Ikebukuro
Location
- Location within Saitama Prefecture Location within Japan

Higashi-Matsuyama Station (東松山駅, Higashimatsuyama-eki) is a passenger railway station located in the city of Higashimatsuyama, Saitama, Japan, operated by the private railway operator Tōbu Railway.

== Lines ==
Higashi-Matsuyama Station is served by the Tōbu Tōjō Line from Ikebukuro in Tokyo. Located between Takasaka and Shinrin-kōen, it is 49.9 km from the Ikebukuro terminus. All services, (TJ Liner, Kawagoe Limited Express, Rapid Express, Express, Semi Express, Local) stop at this station. During the daytime, the station is served by six trains per hour in each direction.

== Station layout ==
The station consists of two side platforms serving two tracks, with the station building located above the platforms. The platforms were originally island platforms serving four tracks, but the outer tracks were removed following completion of double-tracking beyond to Shinrin-kōen.

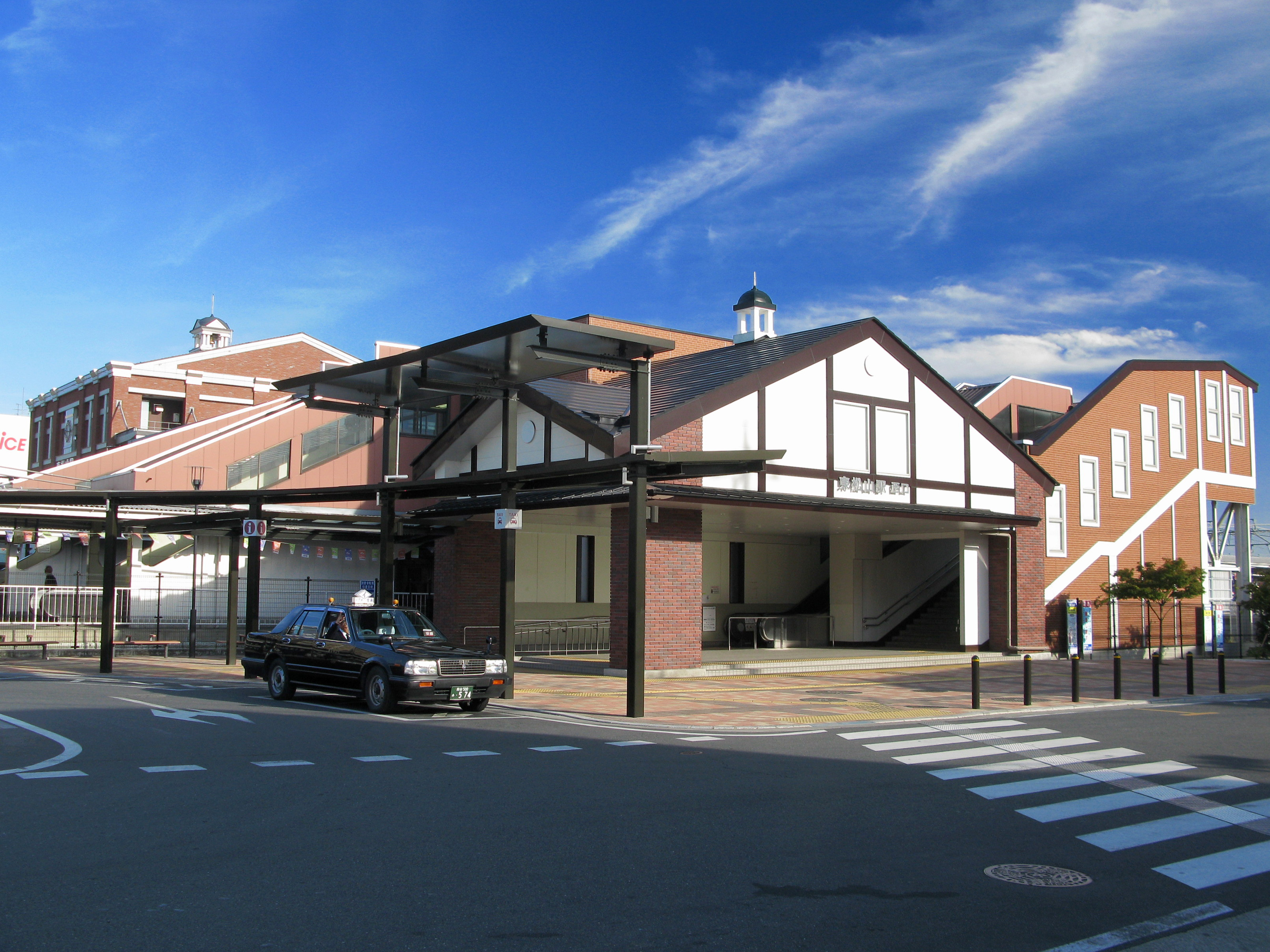
The west entrance in November 2012

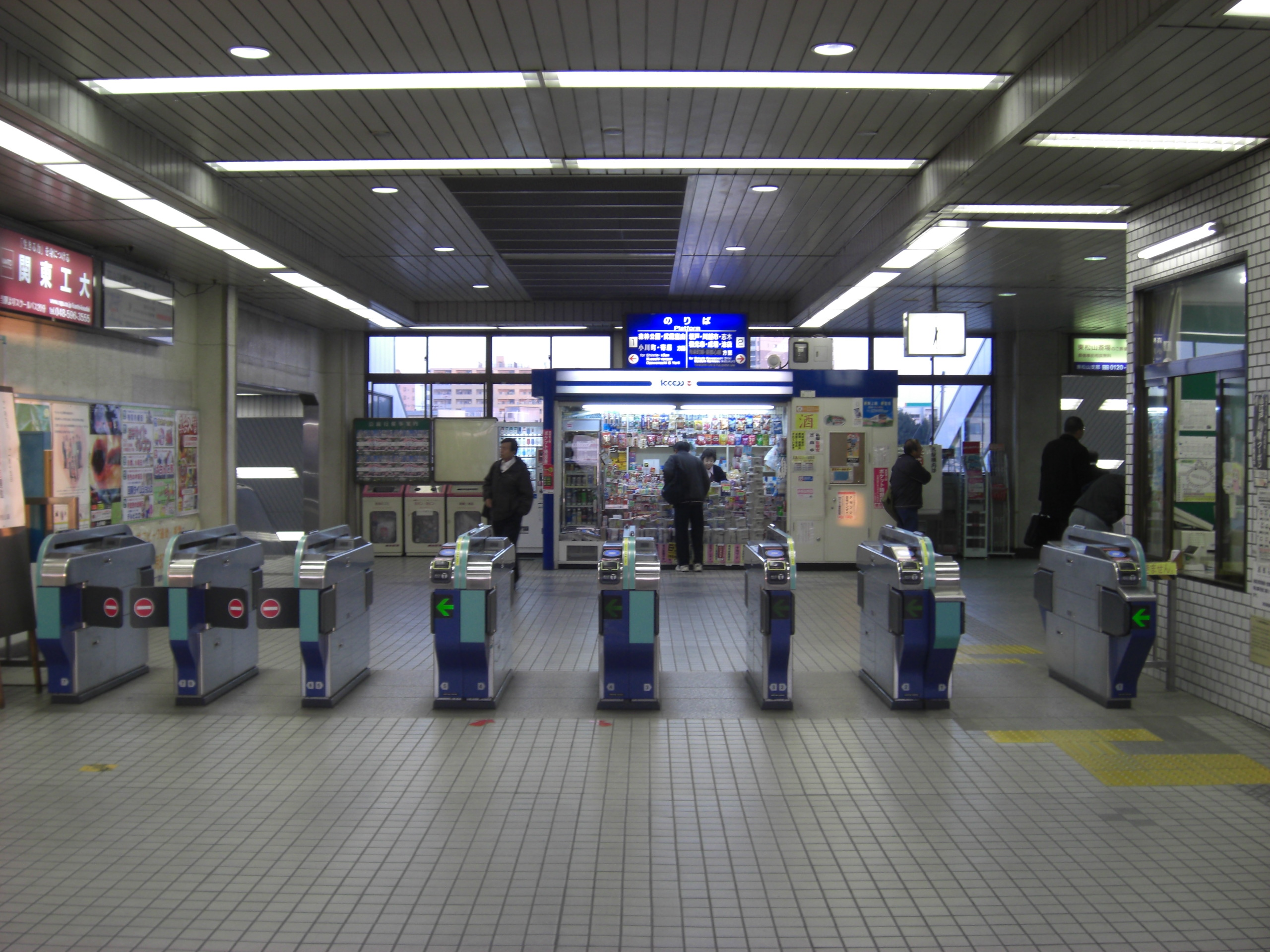
The ticket barriers in November 2008

=== Platforms ===
1	Tōbu Tōjō Line	for Shinrin-kōen, Ogawamachi, and Yorii
2	Tōbu Tōjō Line	for Sakado, Kawagoe, and Ikebukuro; Tokyo Metro Yurakucho Line for Shin-Kiba; Tokyo Metro Fukutoshin Line for Shibuya; Tōkyū Tōyoko Line for Hiyoshi and Yokohama; Tōkyū Shin-Yokohama Line for Shin-Yokohama via Sōtetsu Shin-Yokohama Line for Shōnandai; Minatomirai Line for Motomachi-Chukagai

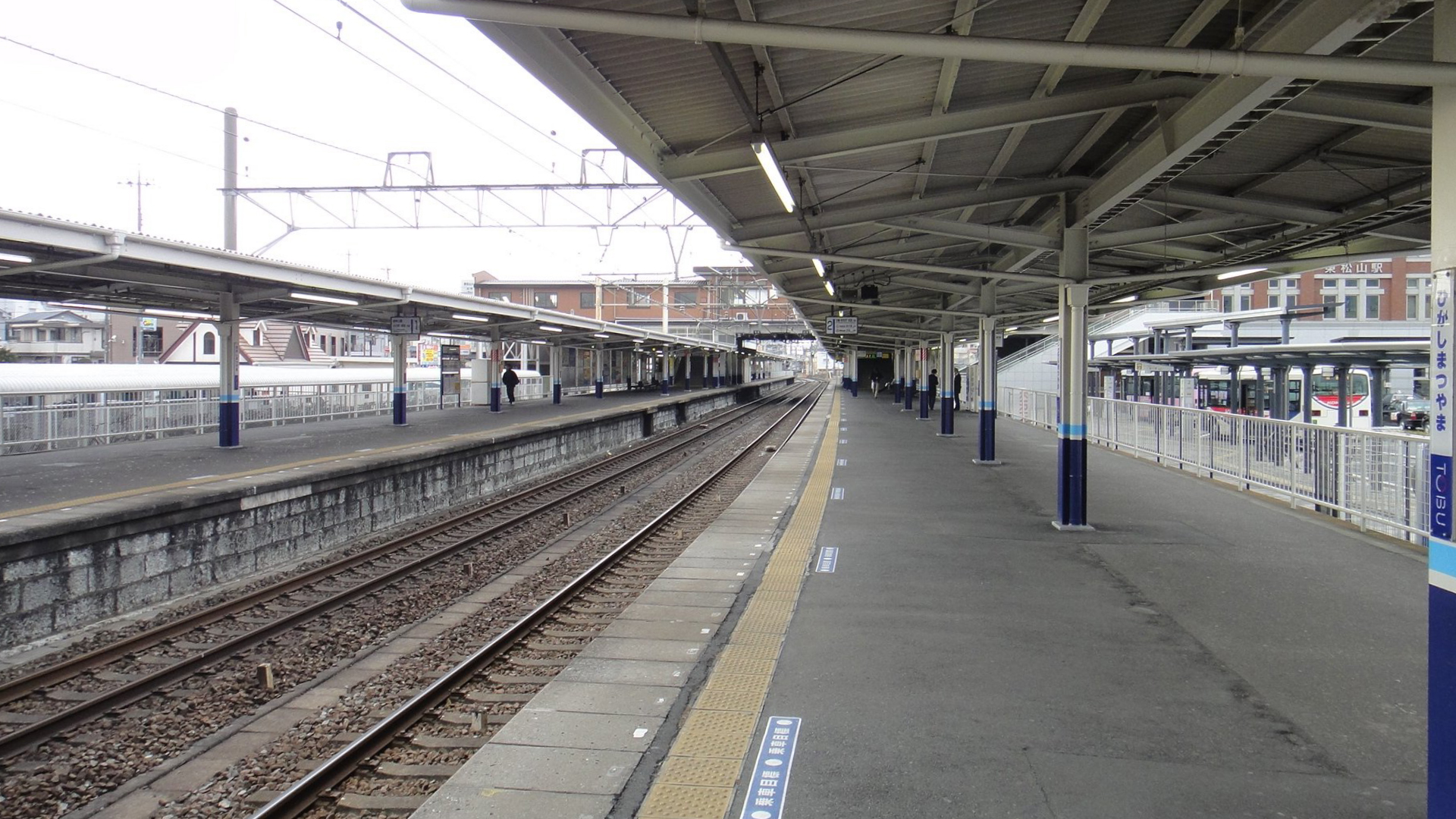
View from the south end of platform 2 looking northward, February 2012

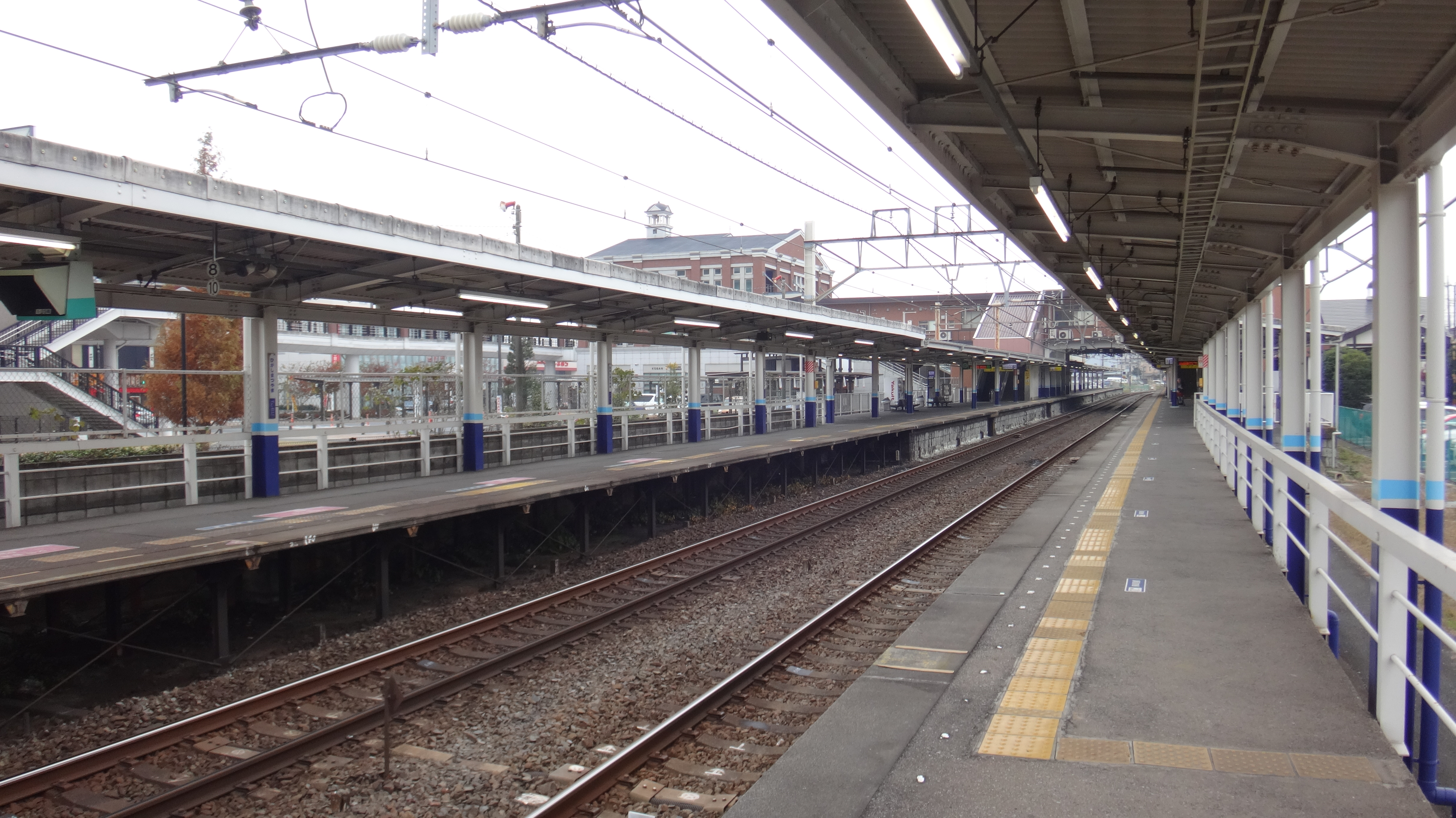
View from the north end of platform 1 looking southward, December 2015

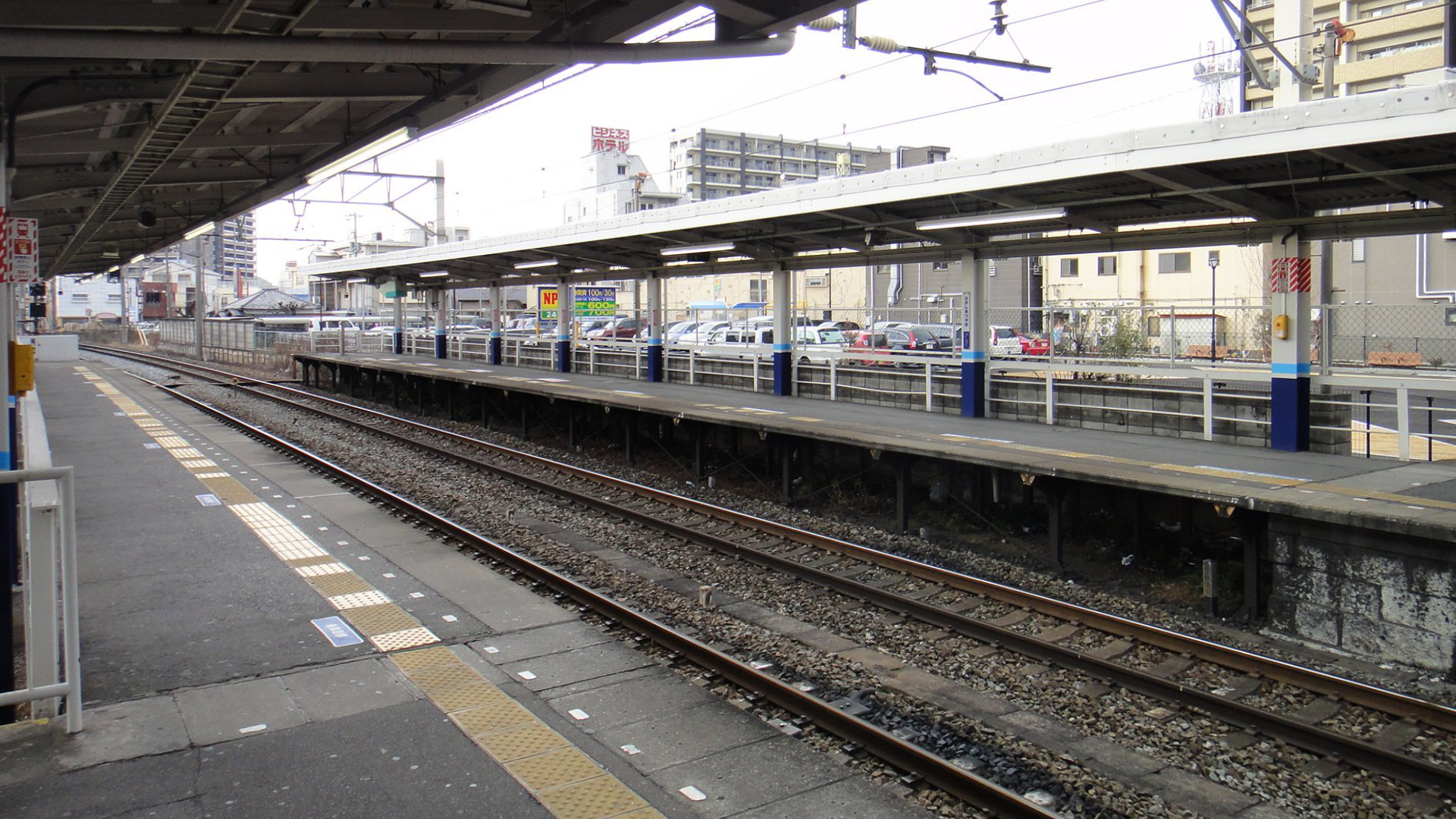
View of the north end of the platforms showing the 2-car-length platform extensions, February 2012

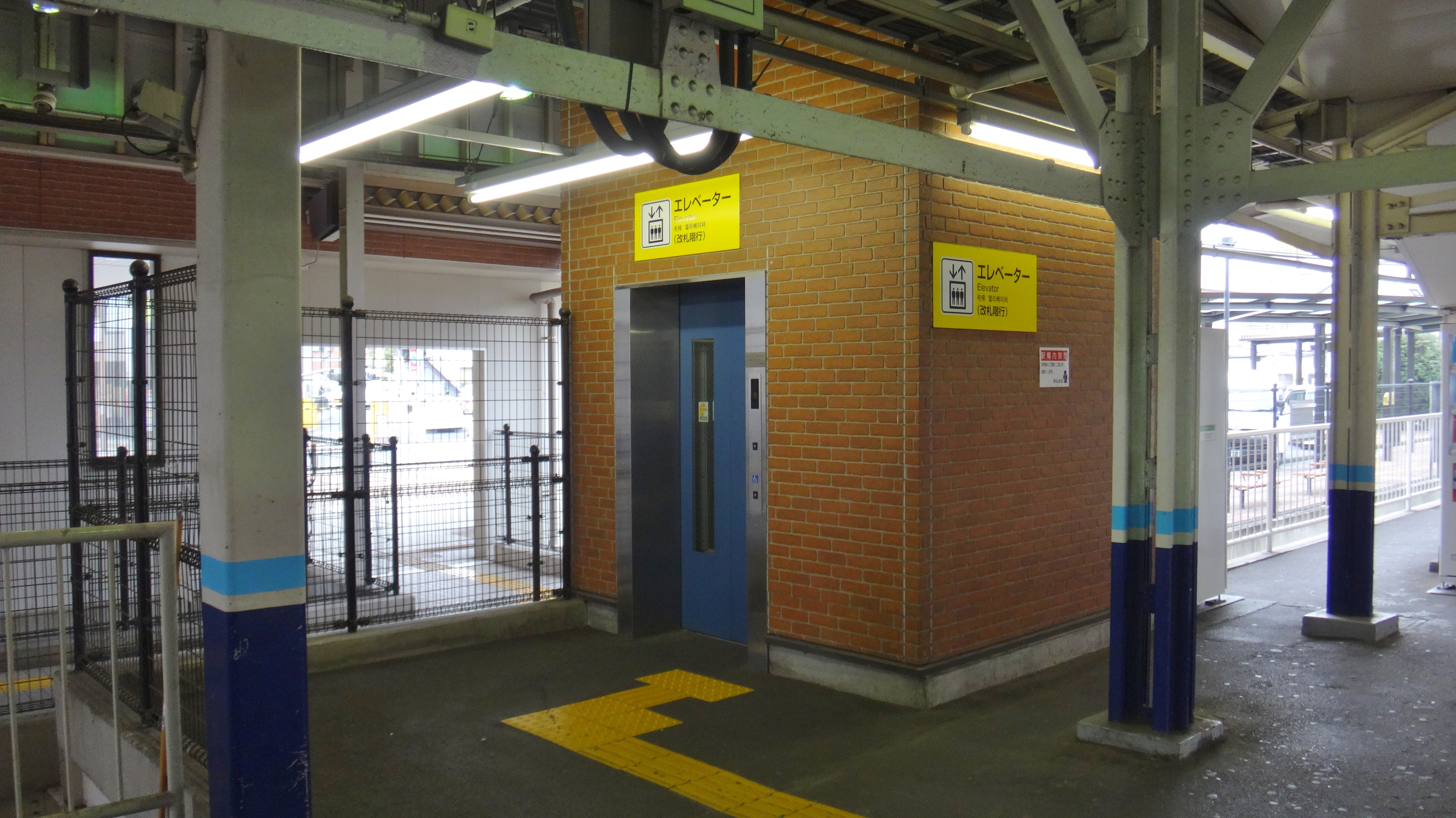
The passenger lift on platform 1 in December 2015

== History ==
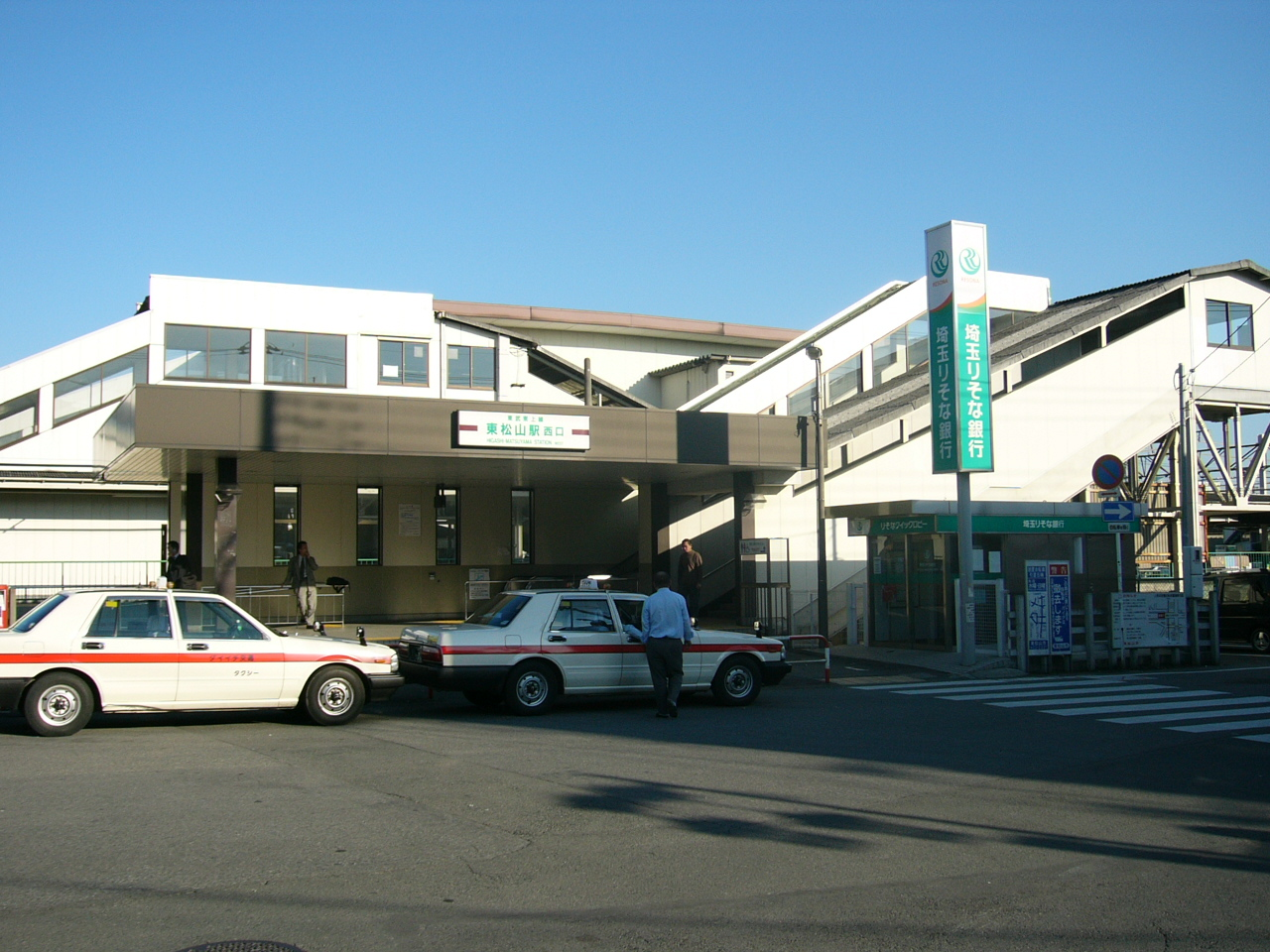
The west entrance of station in 2004, before rebuilding

The station was first opened on 1 October 1923 as Bushū Matsuyama Station (武州松山駅). The station was renamed Higashi-Matsuyama Station in October 1954 when Higashi-Matsuyama became a city. The station building was refurbished between 2008 and 2010 with the addition of lifts on either side.

From 17 March 2012, station numbering was introduced on the Tōbu Tōjō Line, with Higashi-Matsuyama Station becoming "TJ-29".

Through running to and from Shin-Yokohama and Shōnandai via the Tōkyū Shin-yokohama Line, Sōtetsu Shin-yokohama Line, Sōtetsu Main Line, and Sōtetsu Izumino Line commenced on 18 March 2023. Rapid services were abolished, Rapid Express services were changed to make all stops west of Kawagoe, and F Liner services now operate as Rapid Express services instead of Express services.

== Passenger statistics ==
In fiscal 2019, the station was used by an average of 28,778 passengers daily. Passenger figures for previous years (boarding passengers only) are as shown below.

Fiscal year	Daily average
1950	4,046
1960	6,725
1970	11,448
1980	13,391
1990	17,131
2000	13,552
2010	13,650

== Surrounding area ==
- Saitama Children's Zoo
- Saitama Prefectural Higashimatsuyama Girls' High School
- National Route 407

== See also ==
- List of railway stations in Japan
