= Sakado Station (Saitama) =

Railway station in Saitama, Japan

TJ26 Sakado Station 坂戸駅
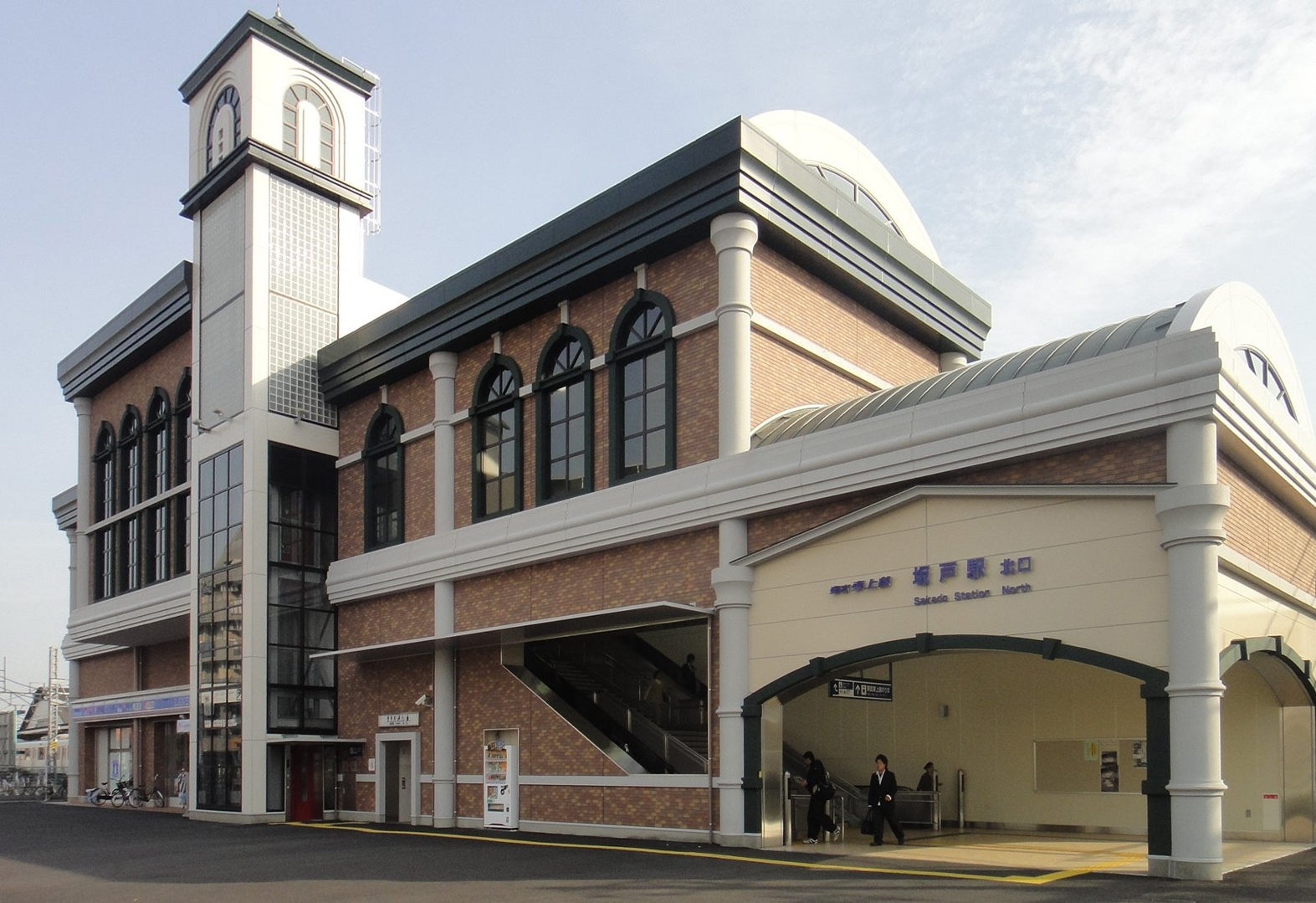
- The north entrance in November 2011

General information
- Location: 1-1 Hinode-chō, Sakado-shi, Saitama-ken 350-0225; Japan
- Coordinates: 35.9572°N 139.3940°E
- Operator: Tōbu Railway
- Lines: Tōbu Tōjō Line; Tōbu Ogose Line
- Distance: 40.6 km from Ikebukuro
- Platforms: 2 island platforms
- Tracks: 4
- Connections: Bus stop

Other information
- Station code: TJ-26
- Website: Official website

History
- Opened: 27 October 1916
- Rebuilt: 2011
- Former names: Sakado-machi (until 1976)

Passengers
- FY2019: 29,107 daily

Services
Preceding station	Tobu Railway	Following station
Higashi-Matsuyama TJ29 towards Ogawamachi	TJ Liner	Kawagoe TJ21 towards Ikebukuro
Higashi-Matsuyama TJ29 towards Ogawamachi	TJ Liner	Kawagoeshi One-way operation
Higashi-Matsuyama TJ29 towards Ogawamachi	Kawagoe	Kawagoeshi TJ22 towards Ikebukuro
Kita-Sakado TJ27 towards Ogawamachi	F Liner	Wakaba TJ25 towards Motomachi-Chūkagai
Kita-Sakado TJ27 towards Yorii	Tojo Line Rapid Express Express Semi Express Local	Wakaba TJ25 towards Ikebukuro
Ippommatsu TJ41 towards Ogose	Ogose Line	Terminus
Location
- Location within Saitama Prefecture Location within Japan

Sakado Station (坂戸駅, Sakado-eki) is a junction passenger railway station located in the city of Sakado, Saitama, Japan, operated by the private railway operator Tōbu Railway.

== Lines ==
Sakado Station is served by the Tōbu Tōjō Line from Ikebukuro in Tokyo. Located between Wakaba and Kita-Sakado, it is 40.6 km from the Ikebukuro terminus. It also forms the starting point of the Tobu Ogose Line branchline to Ogose.

== Services ==
All services, (TJ Liner, Rapid Express, Rapid, Express, Semi express, Local) stop at this station. During the daytime, the station is served by eight trains per hour in each direction on the Tojo Line, and by four trains per hour to Ogose on the Ogose Line.

== Station layout ==
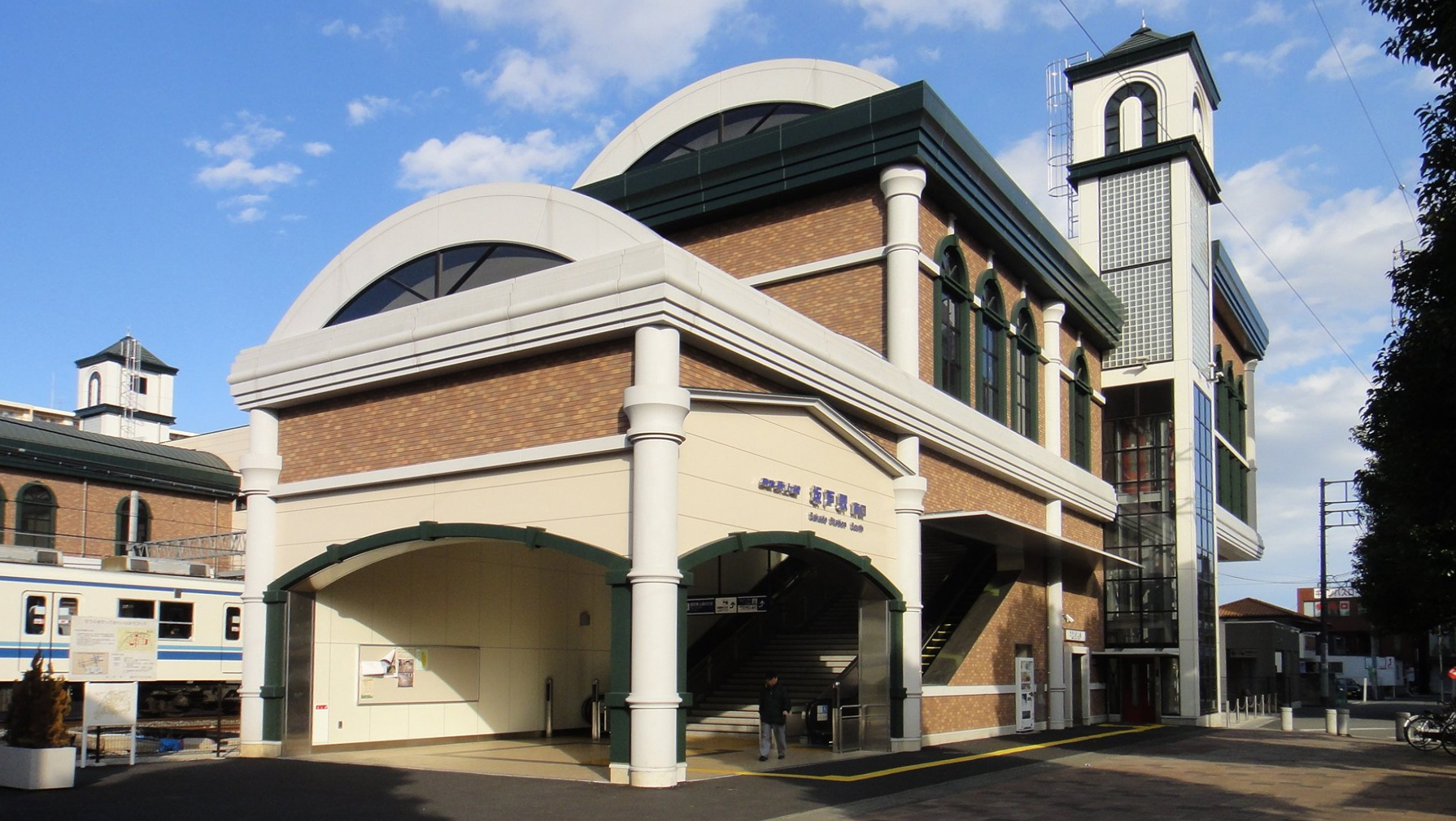
The south entrance with escalators and lift, January 2012

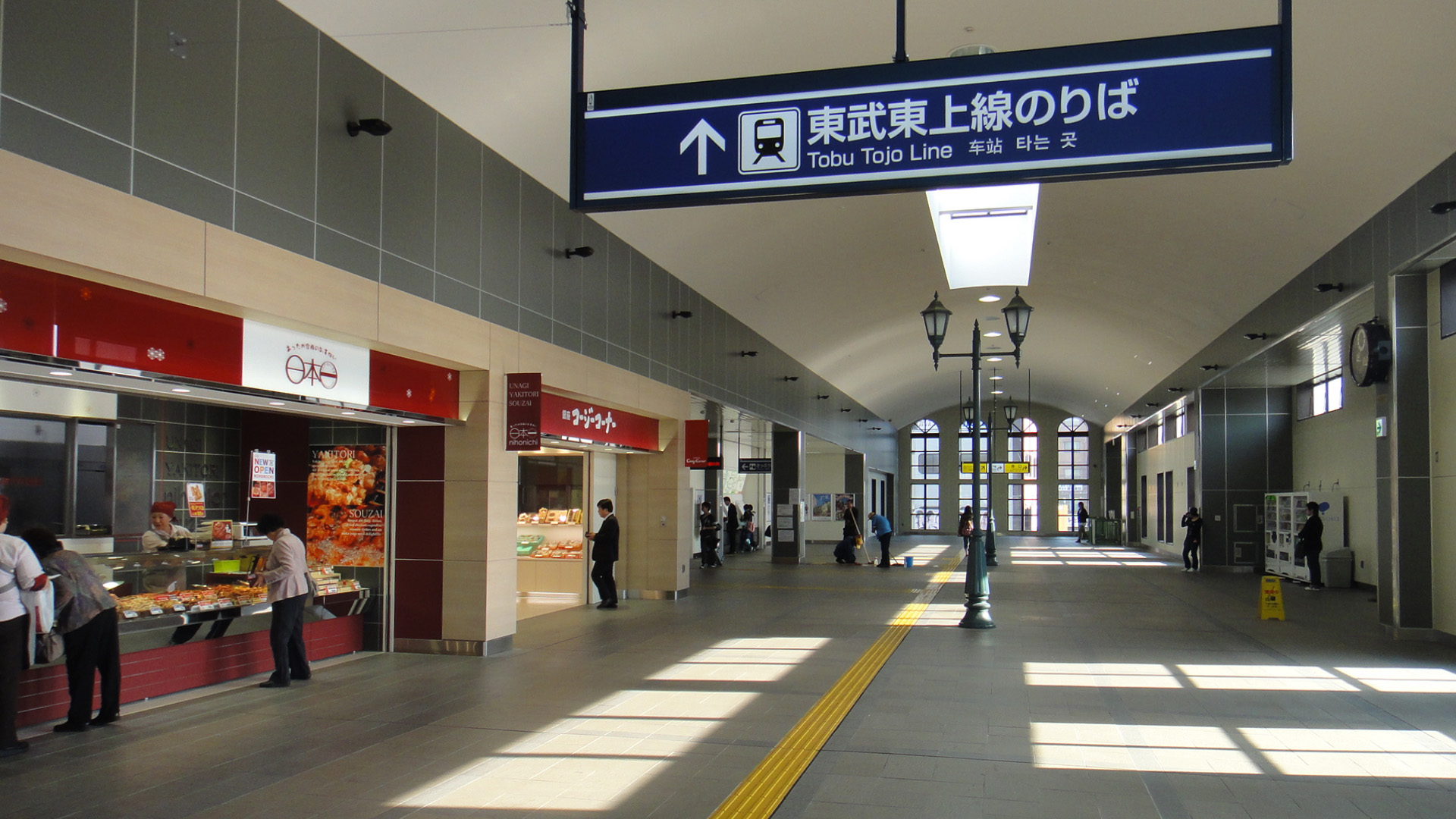
The elevated station concourse, April 2011

The station consists of two sets of island platforms numbered from south to north. From 2010, a new elevated station building provided a central set of ticket gates, replacing the previous exits on the north and south sides.

This station has a season ticket sales office.

A siding on the north side of the station is used for storing track maintenance machines. A stabling track for Ogose Line trains lies to the east of the station, next to the permanent way depot. This was created in 2008.

=== Platforms ===
1/2	Tobu Ogose Line	for Ogose
3	Tōbu Tōjō Line	for Shinrinkōen, Ogawamachi, and Yorii
4	Tōbu Tōjō Line	for Kawagoe, Wakōshi, and Ikebukuro; Tokyo Metro Yurakucho Line for Shin-Kiba; Tokyo Metro Fukutoshin Line for Shibuya; Tōkyū Tōyoko Line for Hiyoshi and Yokohama; Tōkyū Shin-Yokohama Line for Shin-Yokohama via Sōtetsu Shin-Yokohama Line for Shōnandai; Minatomirai Line for Motomachi-Chukagai

The Ogose Line platforms (1 and 2) are 4 cars long, and the Tojo Line platforms (3 and 4) are 10 cars long.

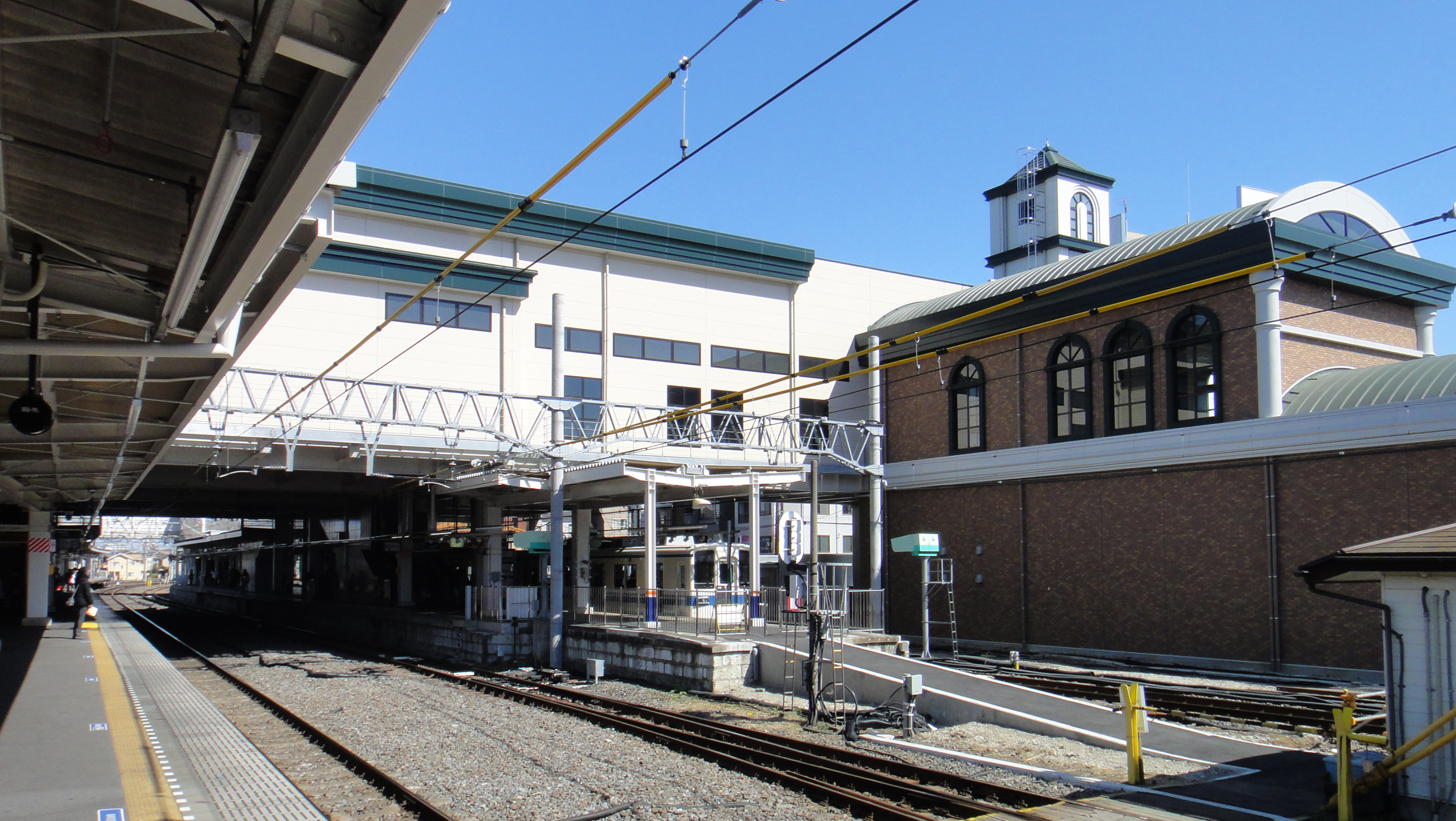
View of the station building and Ogose Line platforms 1/2, from platforms 3/4, April 2011

== History ==
The station first opened on 27 October 1916, named Sakado-machi Station (坂戸町駅), coinciding with the extension of the Tojo Railway from Kawagoe. At the time of opening, the journey time from Ikebukuro was approximately 1 hour 40 minutes (compared to 45 minutes by express in 2008). The Ogose Line was opened from Sakado Station on 17 February 1932, initially as a freight line as far as Morido (森戸). The Ogose Line was extended from Morido to Ogose on 16 December 1934, from which date passenger service commenced.

From the 1920s, a track continued due westward to the Komagawa River for transporting gravel. This operated until the 1960s. The track maintenance storage track stub to the west of the station, between the Tojo Line and Ogose Line tracks is the truncated remainder of this former line.

The station was renamed Sakado on 1 September 1976 when Sakado became a city. In 1986, the locomotive depot at the east end of the station was closed, although the sheds remain to this day, used as a track maintenance depot.

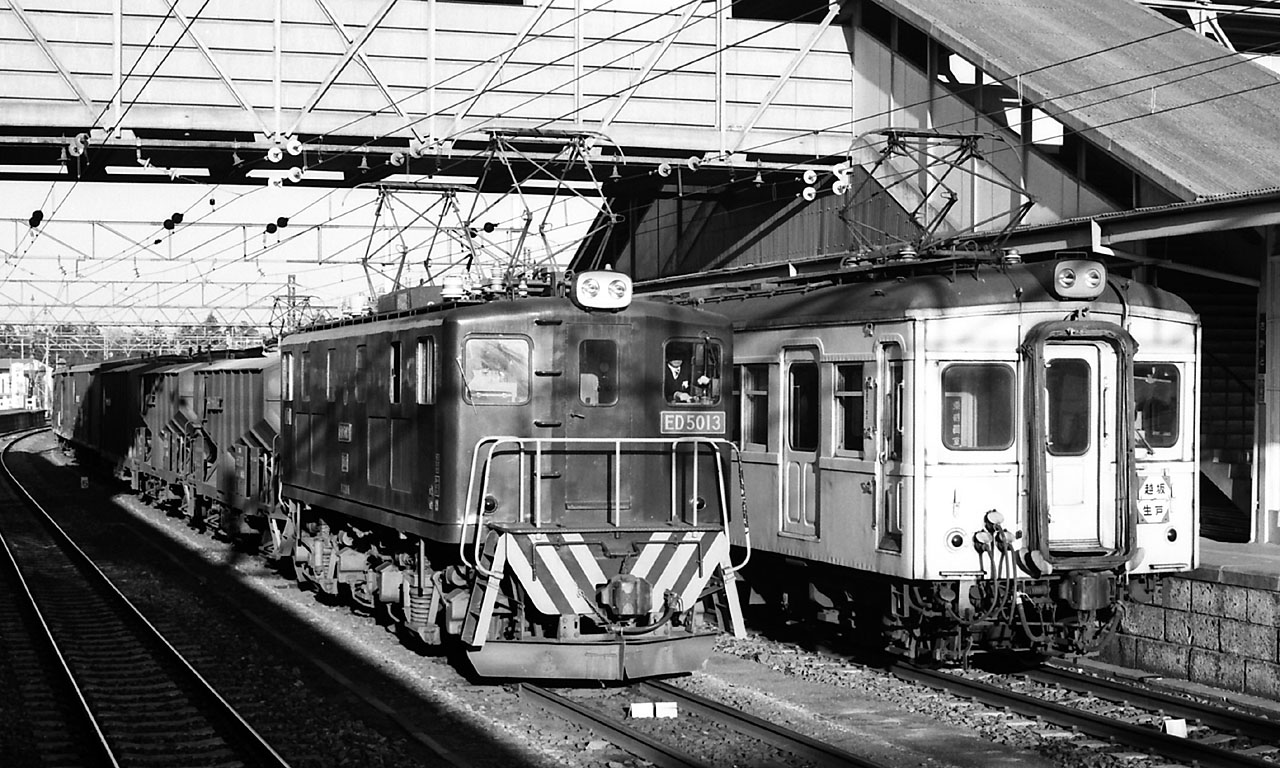
A class ED5010 electric locomotive and Ogose Line 7800 series EMU at Sakado Station, April 1977

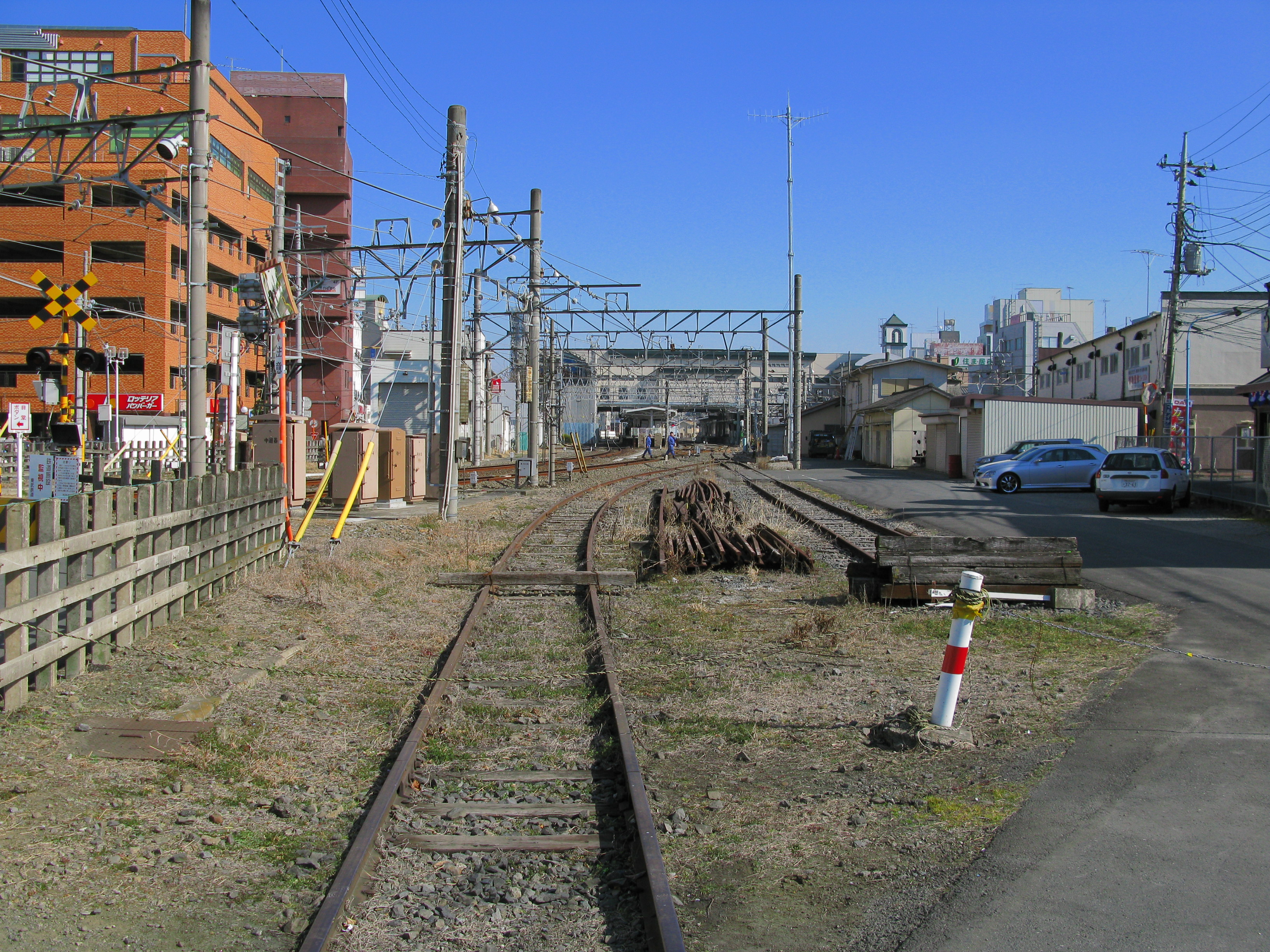
View of the station from the storage line stub formerly a gravel line to the Komagawa River, February 2011

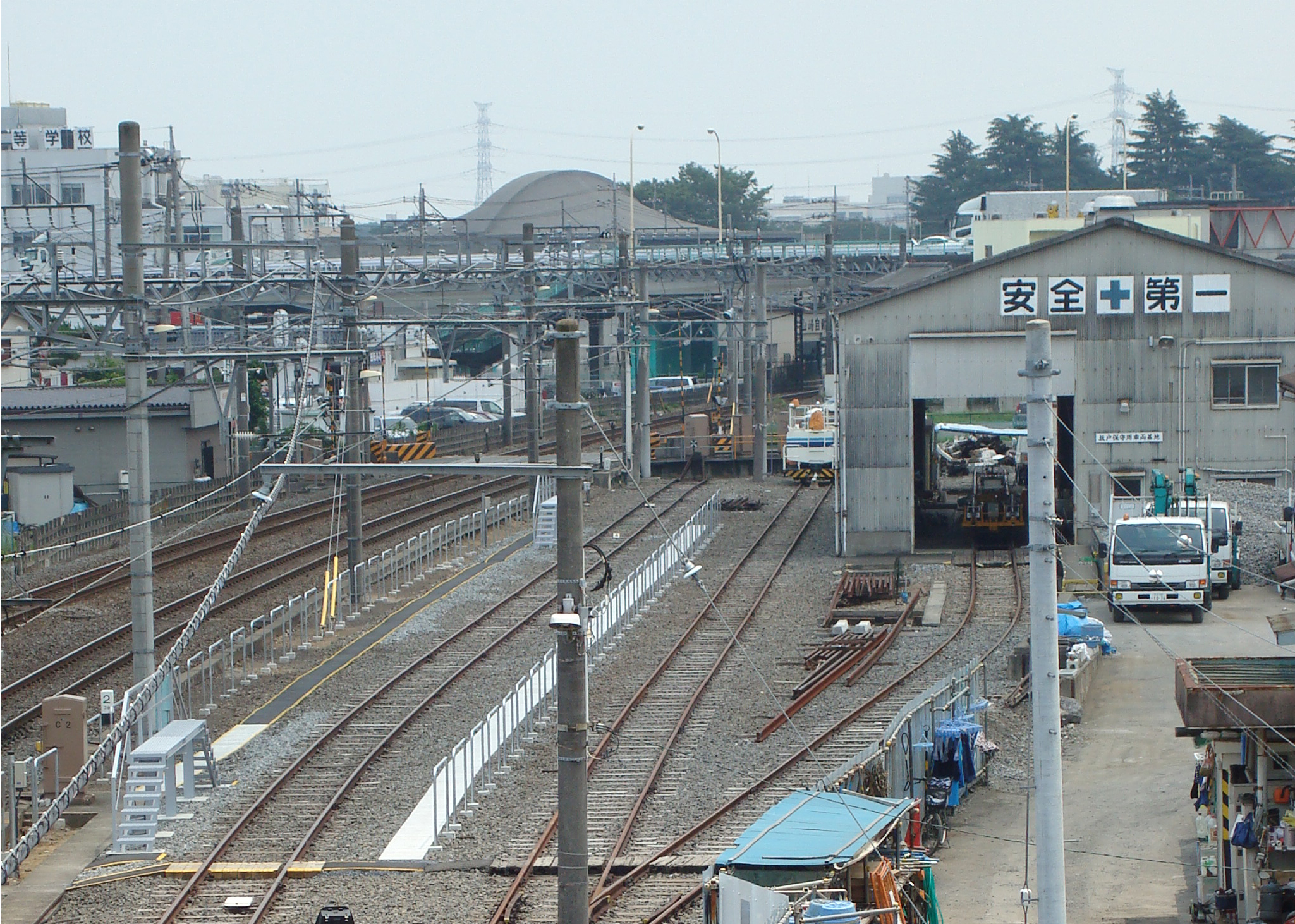
The Ogose Line storage siding and track maintenance depot to the east of the station, June 2008

Mirrors and platform edge sensors were added to the Ogose Line platforms in 2008 ahead of the start of driver-only operation from June 2008.

Work started in 2009 to rebuild the station with an elevated concourse providing a link between the north and south sides of the station. Rebuilding was completed in April 2011.

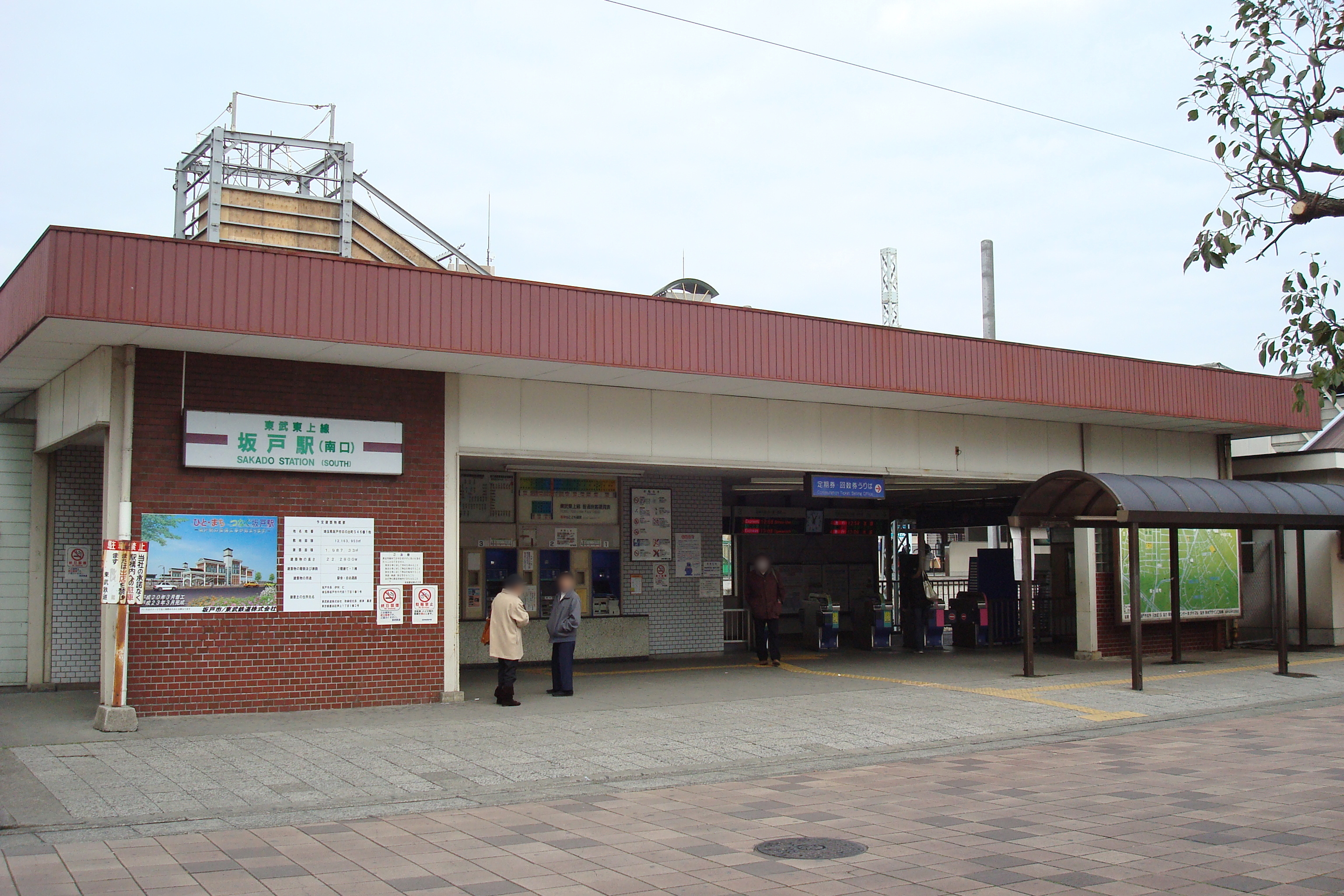
The south entrance in February 2009 before rebuilding

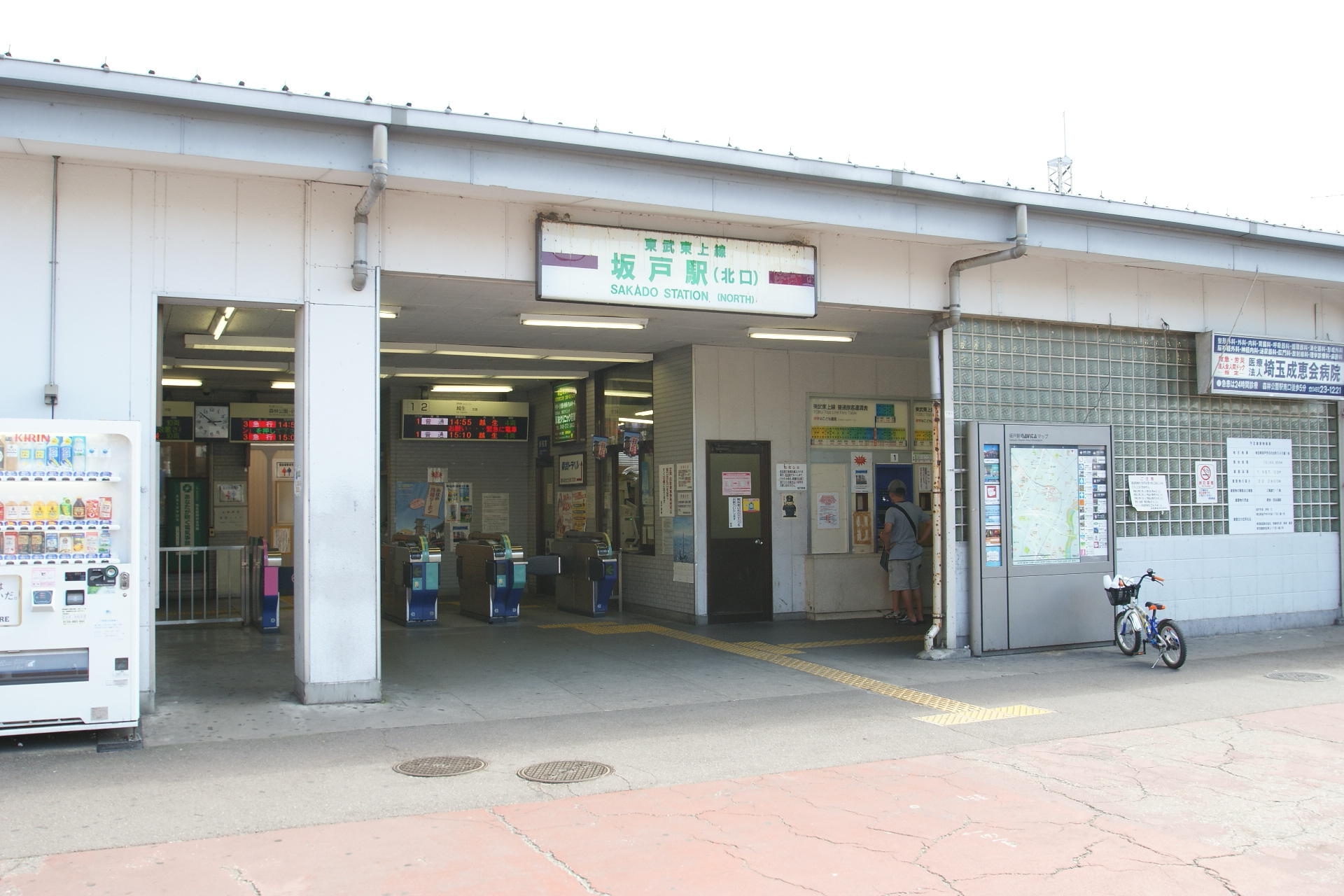
The north entrance in August 2009 before rebuilding

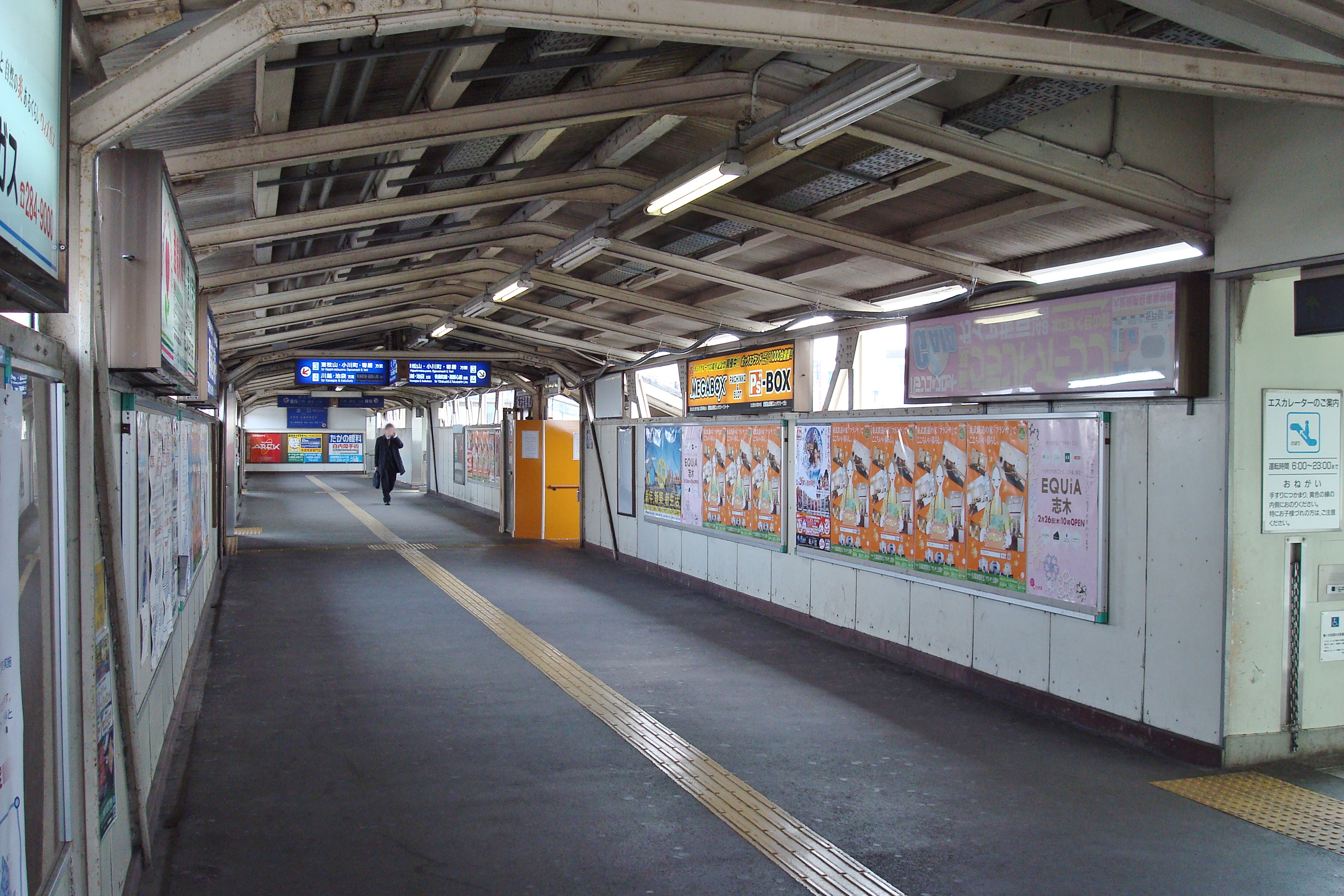
The main station footbridge in February 2009 before demolition and rebuilding

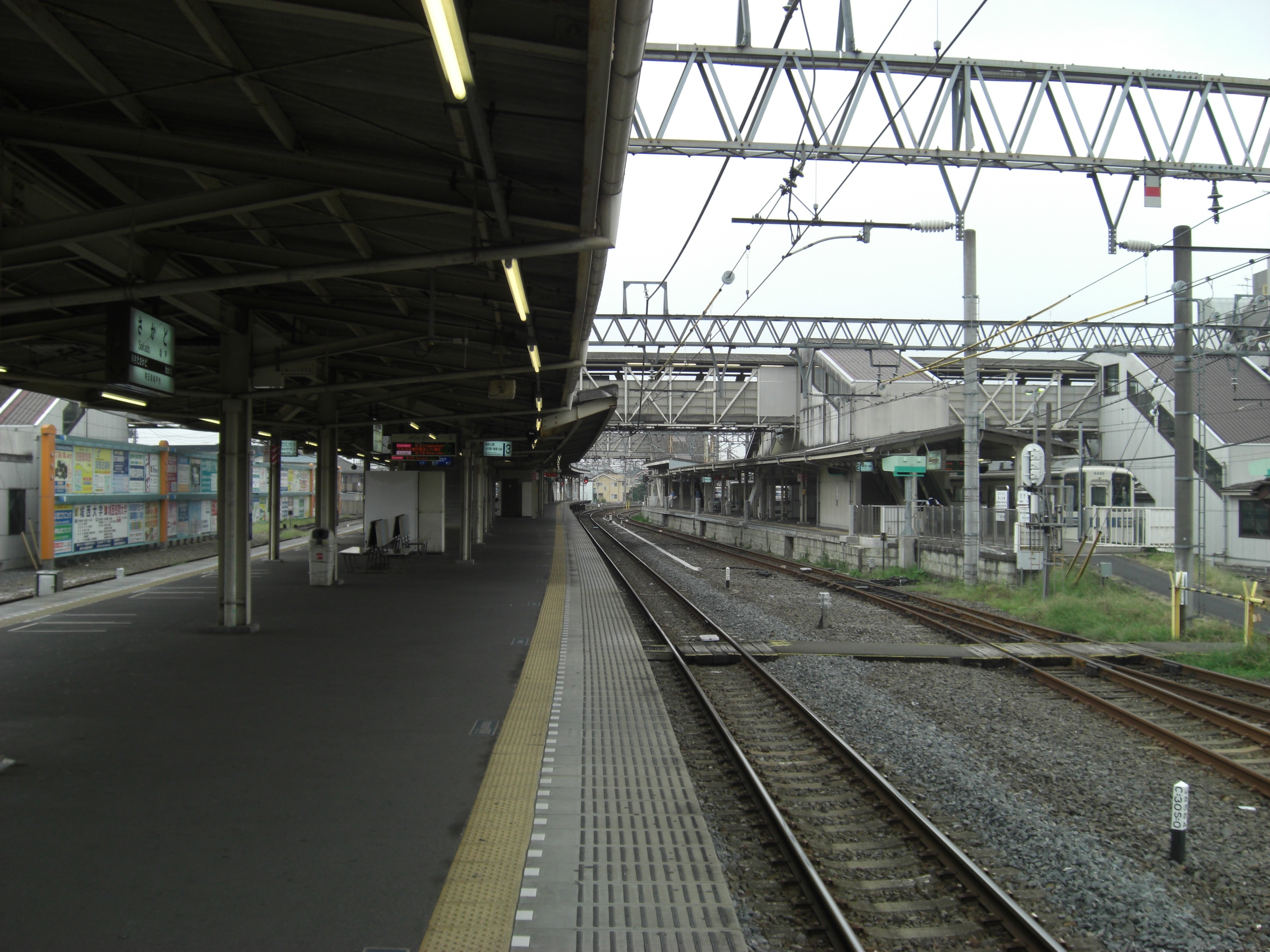
The platforms in September 2008

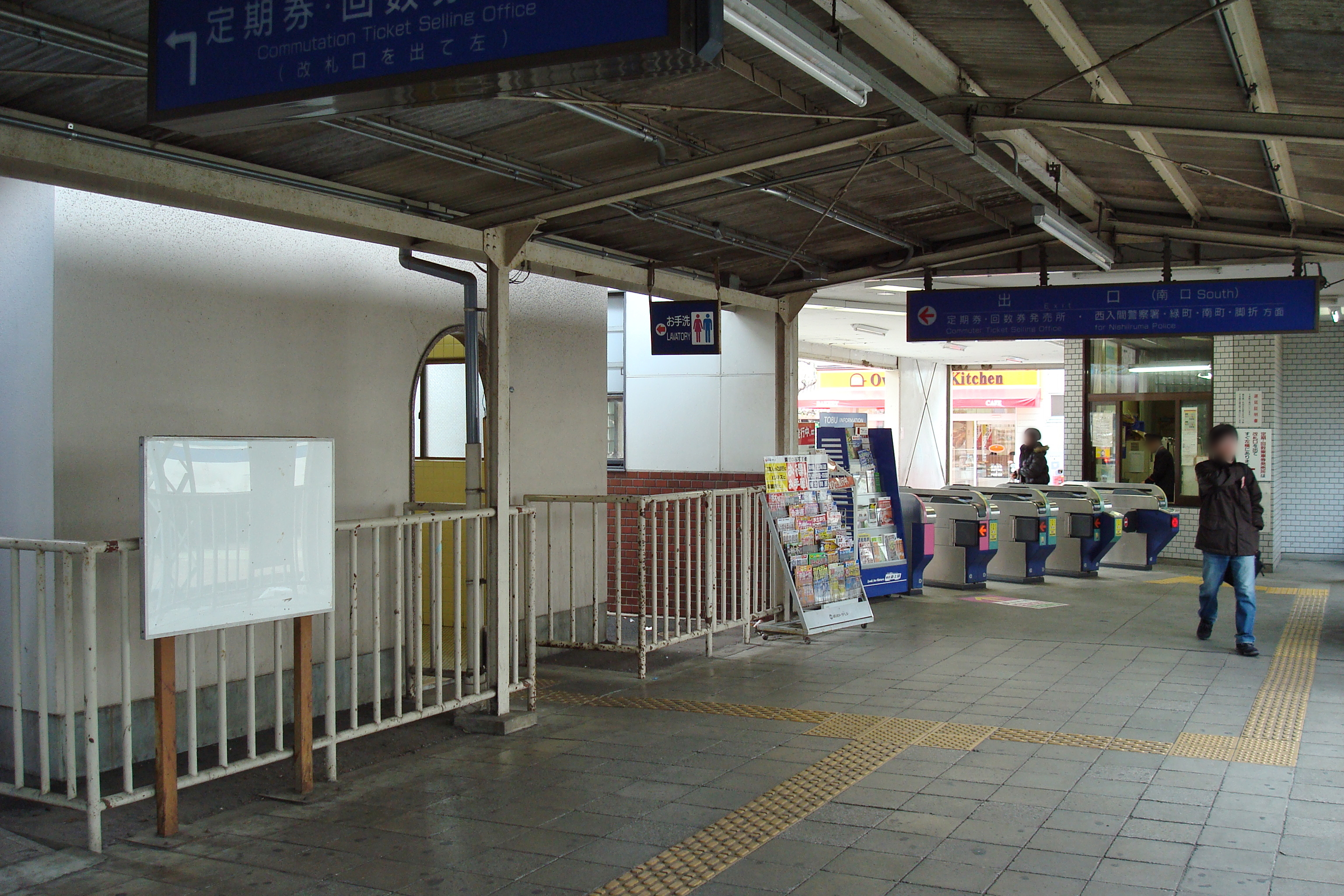
The toilets and ticket barriers on the south side in February 2009 before rebuilding

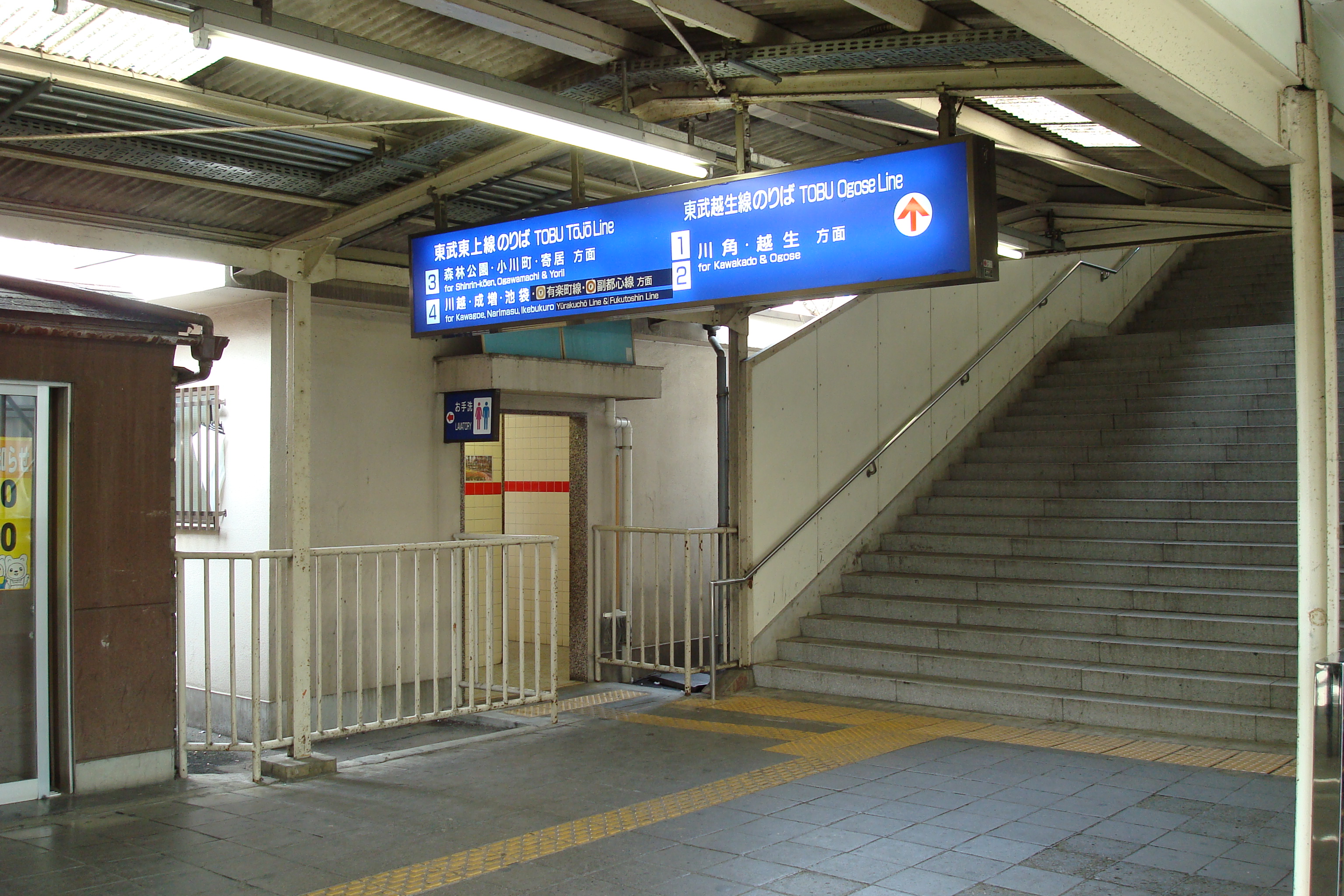
The station toilets on the north side in February 2009 before rebuilding

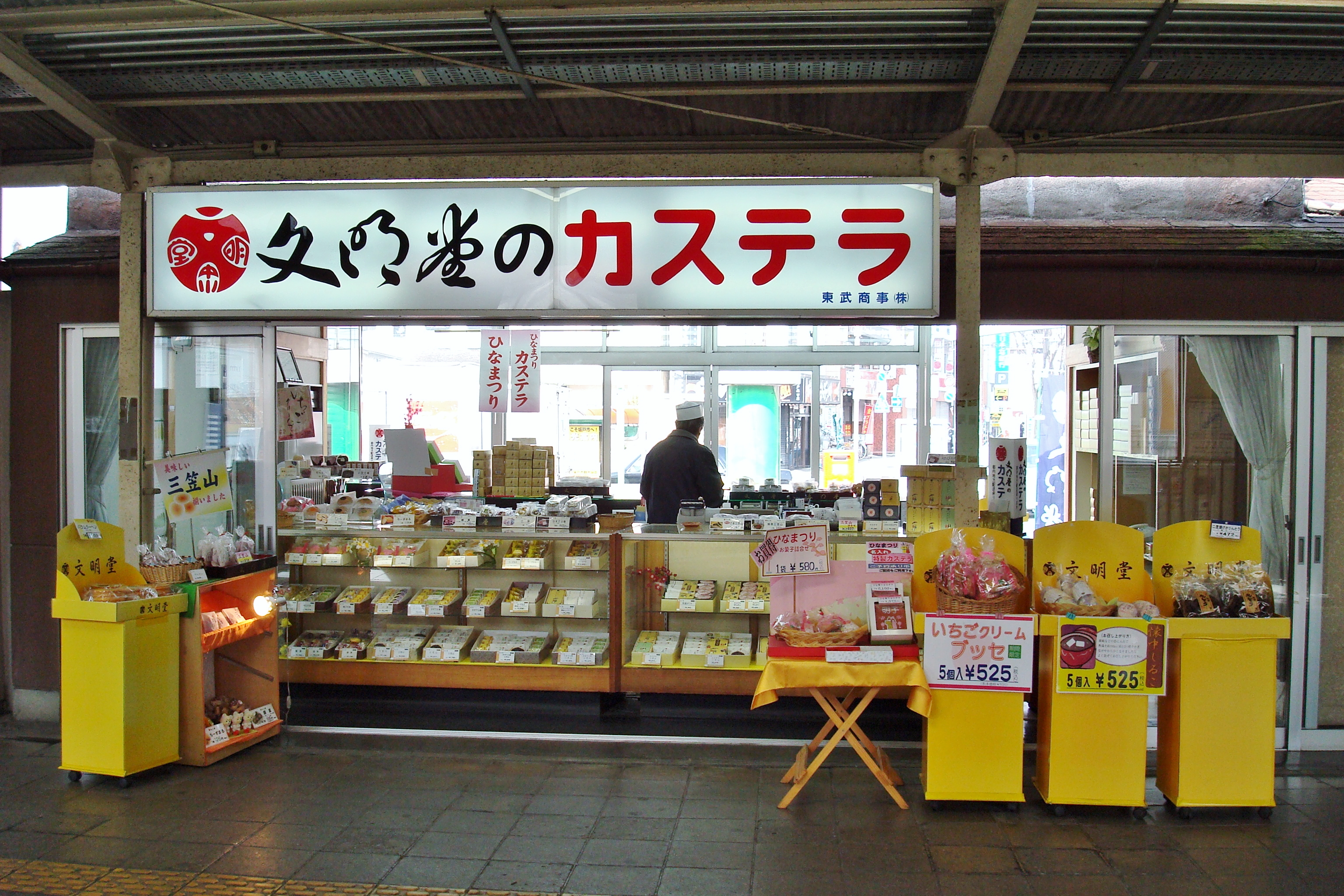
The former Bunmeido Castella shop on the north side of the station in February 2009 before rebuilding

From 17 March 2012, station numbering was introduced on the Tōbu Tōjō Line, with Sakado Station becoming "TJ-26".

Through running to and from Shin-Yokohama and Shōnandai via the Tōkyū Shin-yokohama Line, Sōtetsu Shin-yokohama Line, Sōtetsu Main Line, and Sōtetsu Izumino Line commenced on 18 March 2023.

== Passenger statistics ==
In fiscal 2019, the station was used by an average of 29,107 passengers daily.

Passenger figures for previous years are as shown below.

Fiscal year	Daily average
1950	2,485
1960	4,825
1970	8,440
1980	11,909
1990	15,552
2000	25,374
2005	26,860
2010	26,775
2015	28,472

== Surrounding area ==
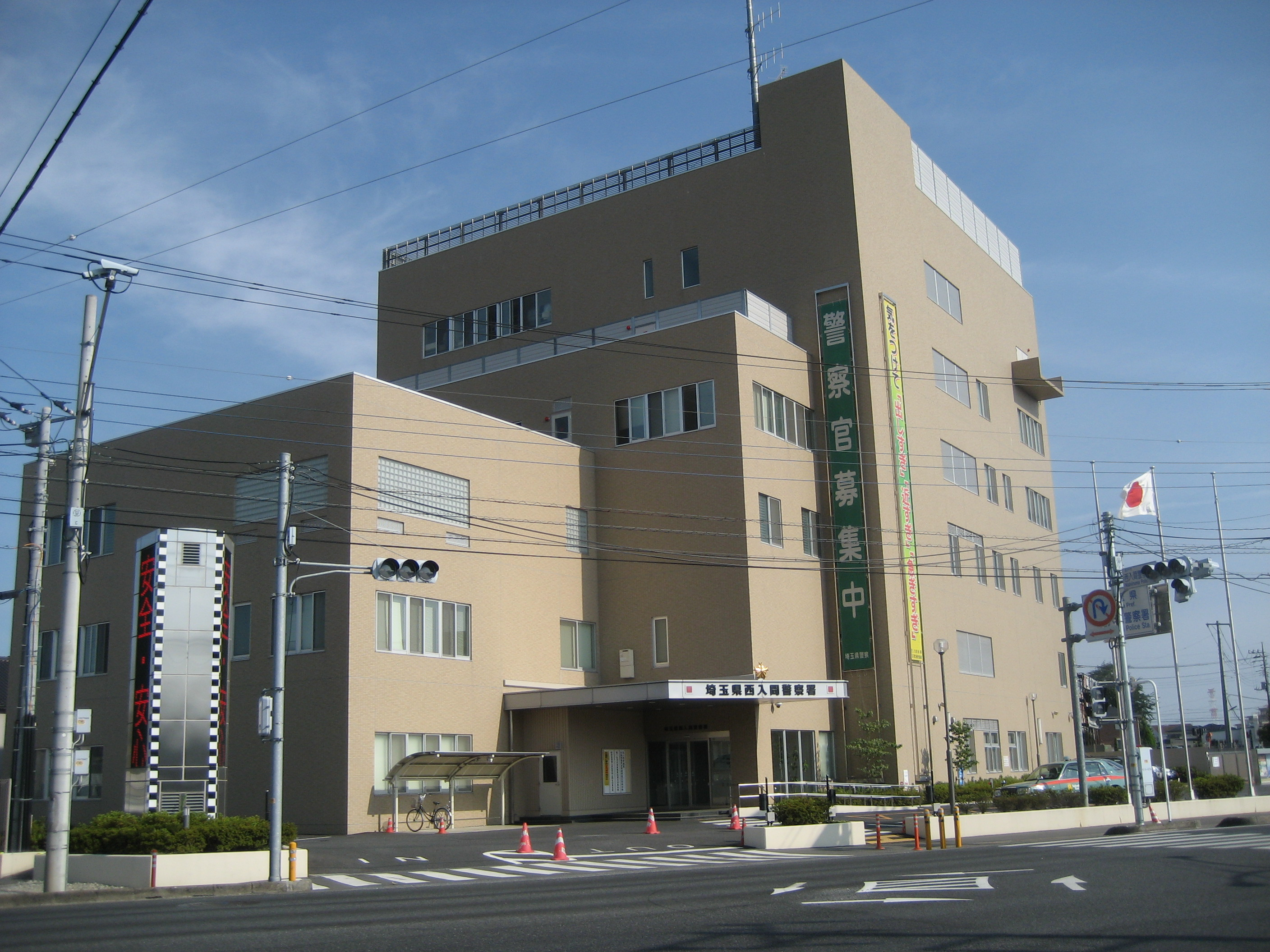
Nishi-iruma Police Station, August 2013

- Sakado City Office
- Nishi-Iruma Police Station
- Sakado Central Library

=== Education ===
- Yamamura International High School
- Asahano Junior High School
- Sakado School for the Deaf

=== Hotels ===
- Sakado Hotel
- Hotel Sun Road
- Sakado Grand Hotel

== Bus services ==
The north side of the station is served by the "Sakacchi Bus" (Ōya Line) and "Sakacchi Wagon" (Nissai Line) community minibus services operated by the city of Sakado. The south side is served by the "Sakacchi Bus" (Tsurumai Line) and "Sakacchi Wagon" (Shigaichi Line) community minibus services.

The following long-distance express bus services operate from the south side of the station.

- Narita Airport (via Kawagoe Station), operated jointly by Chiba Kōtsū, Kawagoe Motor Corp, and Tobu Bus West
- Haneda Airport, operated jointly by Kokusai Juo and Airport Transport Service (Limousine Bus)
- Kyoto and Osaka, Wing Liner overnight service operated by Kintetsu Bus

== See also ==
- List of railway stations in Japan
- Sakado Station (Fukuoka) in Fukuoka Prefecture
- Sakado Station (Ibaraki) on the former Kashima Railway Line in Ibaraki Prefecture (closed March 2007)
