= Sakima Art Museum =

Museum of art in Ginowan, Okinawa, Japan

- 佐喜眞美術館
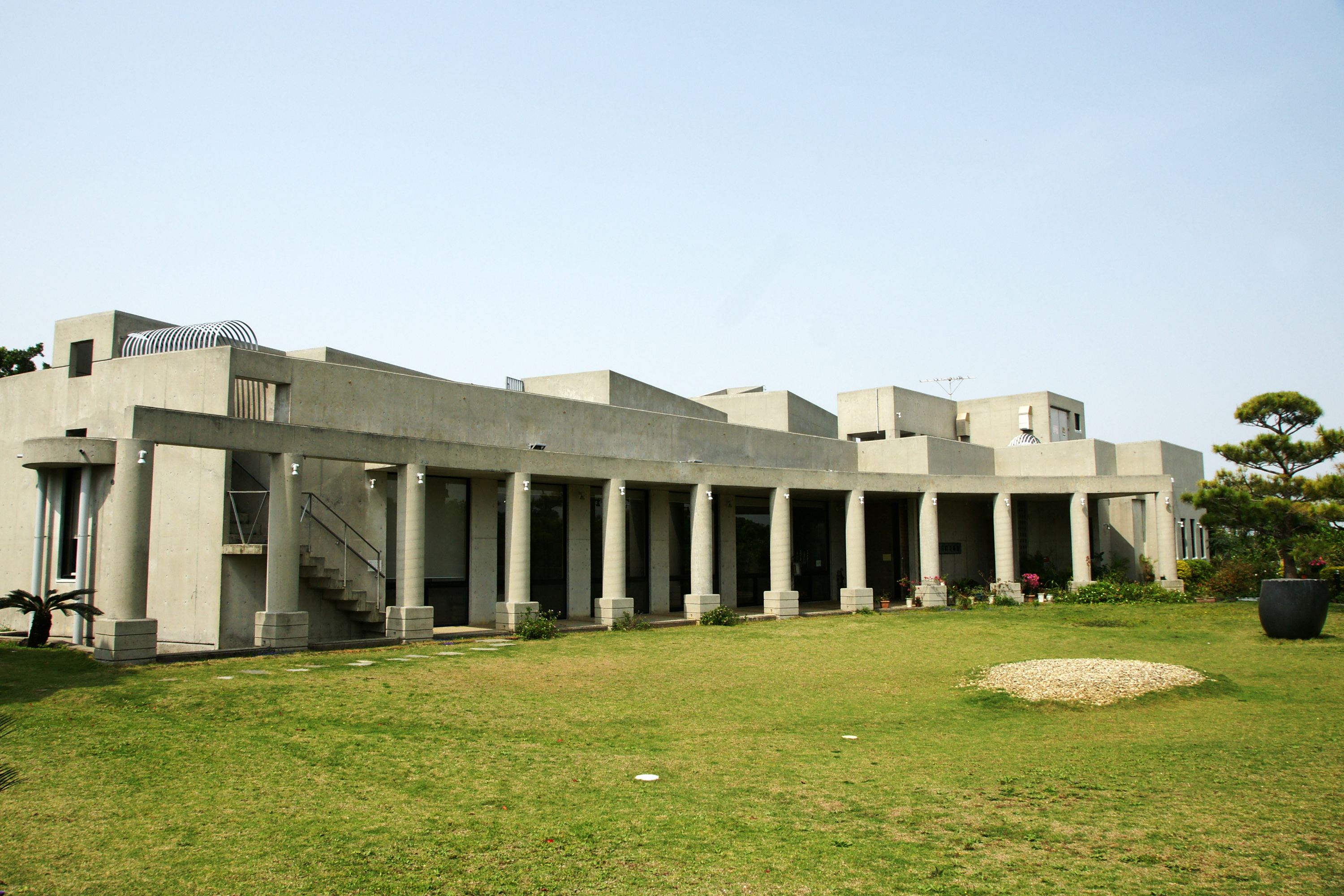
- Interactive map of the Sakima Art Museum area

General information
- Location: 358 Uehara, Ginowan, Okinawa, Okinawa Prefecture, Japan
- Coordinates: 26°16′41″N 127°46′30″E
- Opened: 23 November 1994

Website
- Official website (ja)

Sakima Art Museum (佐喜眞美術館, Sakima Bijutsukan) is a private art museum that opened in Ginowan, Okinawa Prefecture, Japan in 1994. The collection includes The Battle of Okimawa (沖縄戦の図) by Iri and Toshi Maruki, and works by Käthe Kollwitz, Georges Rouault, Yayoi Kusama, and Ueno Makoto.

== See also ==
- Urasoe Art Museum
- Motobu Udun Tomb
- The Hiroshima Panels
