= KNU =

KNU can refer to:

== Education ==
- Kagawa Nutrition University
- Kangwon National University
- Kazi Nazrul University
- Kongju National University
- Korea Nazarene University
- Kryvo-Rih National University (abbr. KNU)
- Kyiv National University
- Kyrgyz National University
- Kyungpook National University

== Other ==
- Karen National Union
- Kanpur Airport
