= Asako Kishi =

Japanese culinary critic (1923–2015)

- Born: November 22, 1923
- Died: September 22, 2015 (aged 91)
- Education: Kagawa Nutrition University
- Occupations: Culinary critic, journalist, publisher

Asako Kishi (岸 朝子, Kishi Asako; November 22, 1923 – September 22, 2015) was a Japanese culinary critic, journalist, and publisher, best known for her role as a guest judge on Iron Chef.

== Career ==
Kishi was raised in Tokyo, and attended Kagawa Nutrition University. She began her writing career when she joined the Japanese monthly women's magazine Shufu no Tomo in 1955. She later worked for the publishing department of her alma mater and served ten years as editor-in-chief of the magazine Eiyō to Ryori (栄養と料理, Nutrition and Cooking) from 1968 to 1978.

In 1979, she created a publishing company specializing in magazines and books on cooking and nutrition. She published Sushi: A Light and Right Diet in 1986.

From 1993 to 1999, she made regular appearances as one of the guest judges on the original Iron Chef television program on Fuji Television.

Kishi died in Tokyo of heart failure on September 22, 2015 at the age of 91.
