= Yamamura International High School =

Coordinates: 35°57′21.9″N 139°24′5.9″E

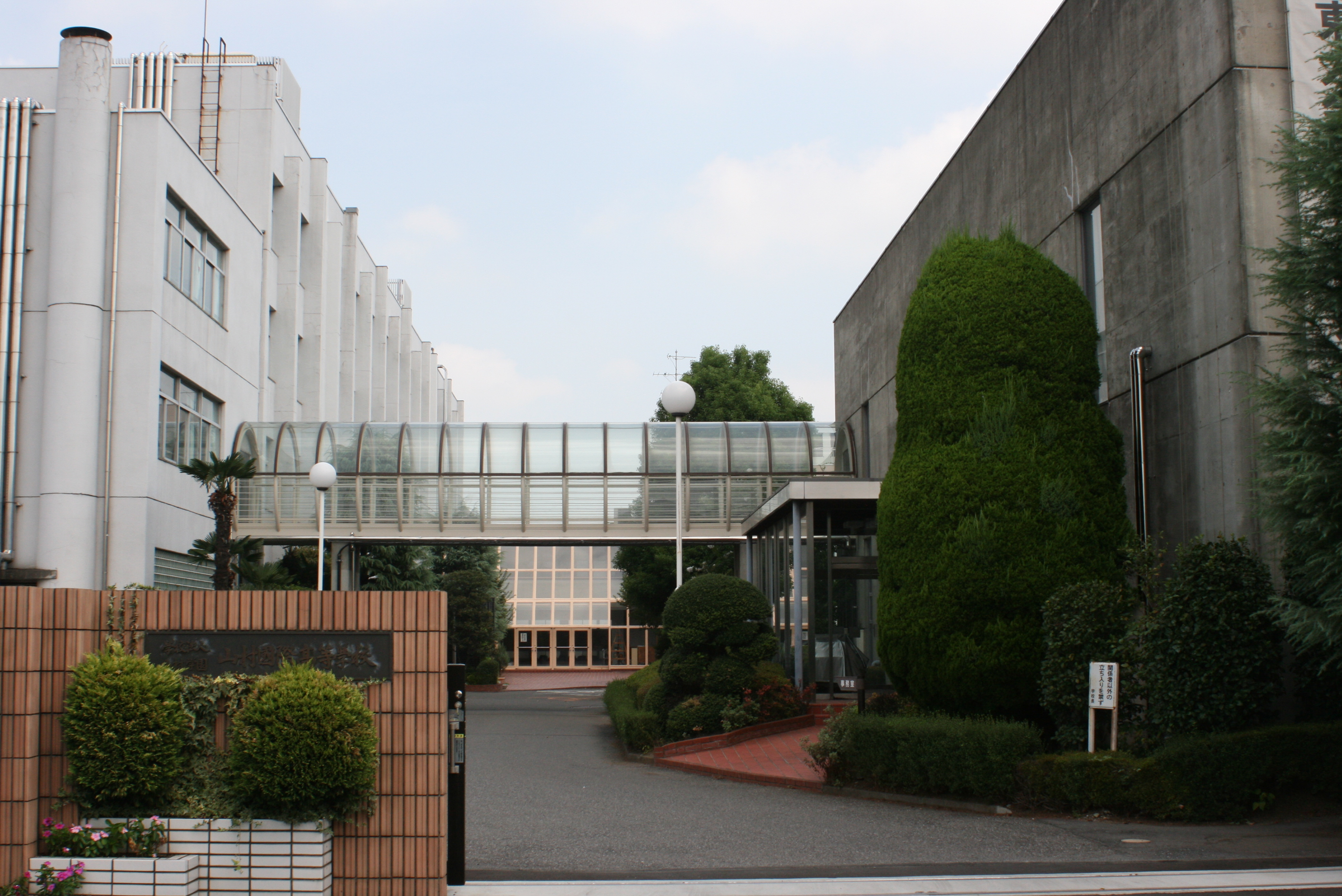
- Sakado, Saitama; Japan

Information
- Type: independent
- Established: 1922
- School district: Saitama Board of Education
- Principal: Naoto Hori
- Website: https://www.yamamurakokusai.net/english

Yamamura International High School (山村国際高等学校, Yamamura Kokusai Kōtō Gakkō) is a Japanese high school in Sakado, Saitama, Japan. It follows the Japanese national curriculum. It is a member of Yamamura Gakuen, which includes Yamamura Gakuen College and Yamamura Gakuen High School.

== History ==
In September 1922, Yamamura School was founded as a school for girls by Fumiyo Yamamura. In 1959, as another school opened in Kawagoe, Saitama, the school on the present site was renamed Yamamura Second Girls' High School. In 1991, the school was renamed Yamamura Kokusai Girl's High School and in 1991 it became co-educational: Yamamura International High School.

== Present day ==
The school competes in national and international competitions. Its dance team competes nationally and won the National DCC dance contest in 2021. They are frequently televised, appearing alongside Japanese idol dance groups. The wind ensembles consistently appear in the Nippon Wind Orchestra Ensemble Contest arranged by Japan Musical Education and Culture Promotion Society, winning major awards in 2019 and 2020. Baton twirling and Yokasoi troupes, and biology club have been featured on the national stage.

Although lessons and daily life are principally in Japanese, the school promotes international understanding through the direct employment of highly skilled foreign teachers, sister school exchanges, foreign travel, and by accepting students from overseas.

The school purchased a second sports ground and has been promoting its baseball and soccer teams. It now has artificial grass tennis courts.

The school buildings have featured in Japanese film and television, including Mop Girl, Papa and Daughter's 7 Days and Kuro no Onna Kyōshi (2012).
