= Shisanji Hokari =

Japanese mathematician

Dr. Shisanji Hokari (穂刈 四三二, Hokari Shisanji; 28 March 1908 – 2 January 2004) was a Japanese mathematician. He was admitted to the American Mathematical Society in 1966. He was a professor emeritus of Tokyo Metropolitan University and the president of Josai University.

Year	Age	Milestone
1926	18	Enrolled to Tokyo University of Science.
1928	20	Graduated from Tokyo University of Science.
1931	23	Enrolled to Hokkaido University.
1934	26	Graduated from Hokkaido University.
1939	31	Lecturer at Hokkaido University.
1940	32	Received a doctorate. Assistant Professor at Hokkaido University.
1949	41	Professor at Tokyo Metropolitan University.
1971	63	Professor at Josai University. Dean of Faculty of Science.
1971	63	Professor Emeritus at Tokyo Metropolitan University.
1977	69	Honorary Member of Japan Society of Mathematical Education.
1978	70	President of Josai University.
1980	72	President Emeritus of Josai University.
1982	74	Professor Emeritus at Josai University.
1987	79	Received 3rd Class Order of the Rising Sun.
