= Josai Junior College =

Private junior college in Sakado, Saitama, Japan

Coordinates: 35°55′56.3″N 139°20′19.8″E

- 城西短期大学
- Type: Private
- Established: 1983
- Location: Sakado, Saitama, Japan
- Website: www.josai.ac.jp/tandai/

Josai Junior College (城西短期大学, Jōsai Tanki Daigaku) is a private junior college in Sakado, Saitama, Japan. It was established in 1983 as a female-only college, and is attached to Josai University. It became coeducational from 2005.

== Departments ==
- Department of Business management

== See also ==
- List of junior colleges in Japan
- Josai University
