= Hatoyama, Saitama =

Hatoyama 鳩山町
- Town
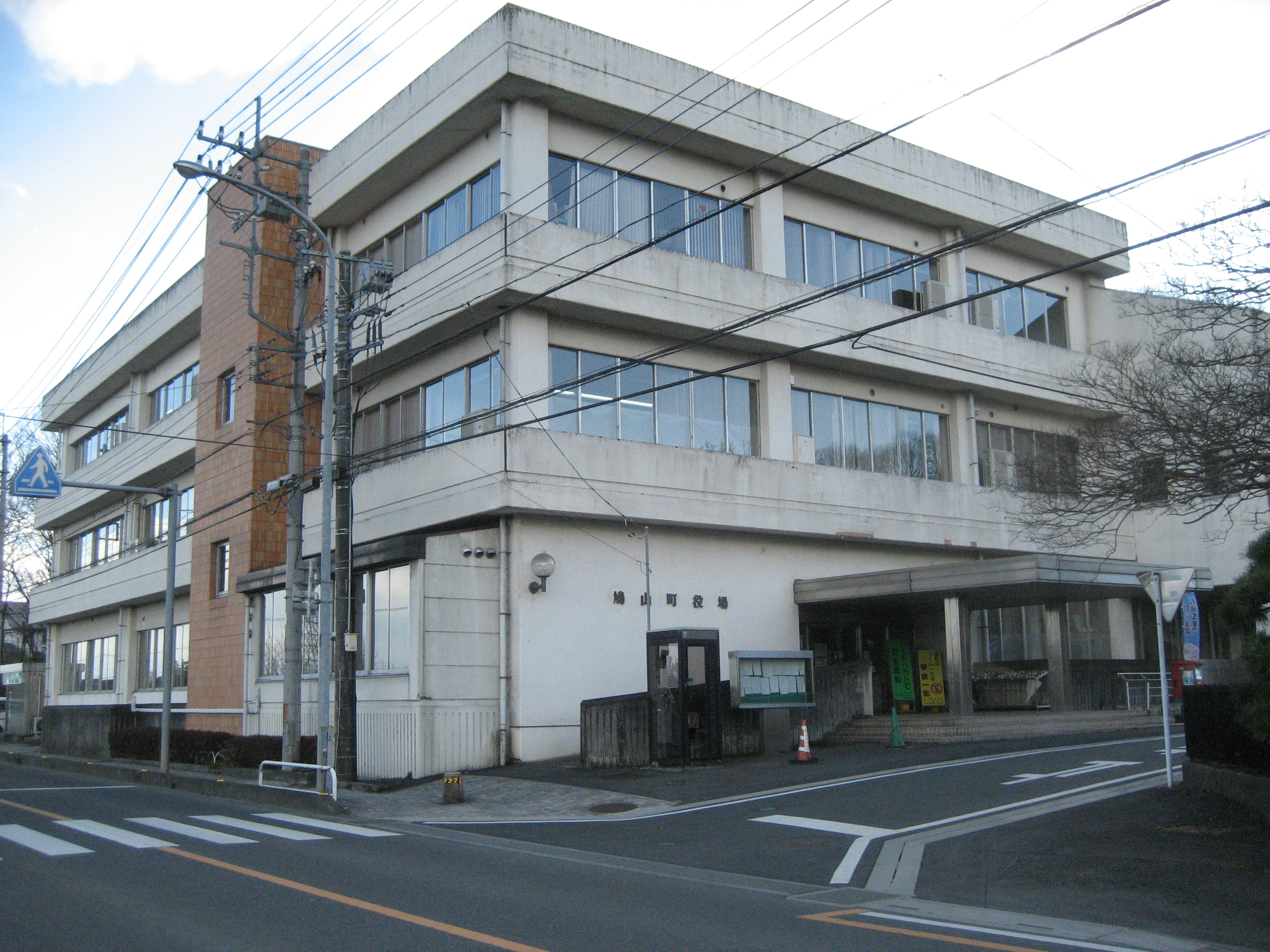
- Hatoyama town office

- Flag Seal

- Location of Hatoyama in Saitama Prefecture

- Coordinates: 35°58′53.2″N 139°20′2.8″E
- Country: Japan
- Region: Kantō
- Prefecture: Saitama
- District: Hiki

Area
  - Total: 25.73 km^{2} (9.93 sq mi)

Population (March 2021)
  - Total: 13,414
  - Density: 521.3/km^{2} (1,350/sq mi)
- Time zone: UTC+9 (Japan Standard Time)
- Phone number: 049-296-1211
- Address: 184-16 Mamedo, Hatoyama-machi, Hiki-gun, Saitama-ken 350-0324
- Climate: Cfa
- Website: Official website
- Symbols
- Bird: Pigeon
- Flower: Azalea
- Tree: Japanese red pine

Hatoyama (鳩山町, Hatoyama-machi) is a town located in Saitama Prefecture, in the central Kantō region of Japan. As of 1 March 2021, the town had an estimated population of 13,414 in 6006 households and a population density of 520 persons per km^{2}. The total area of the town is 25.73 square kilometres (9.93 sq mi). The JAXA Earth Observation Center is located in Hatoyama.

== Geography ==
Hatoyama is located at the geographic center of central Saitama Prefecture. Most of the town is located in the central part of the Iwadono Hills, with the town increasing in elevation from south to north. The eastern side of the town is urbanized due to highway and railway connections, which has resulted in the development of new towns. On the other hand, the northern and western parts of the town are not urbanized, and the scenery of the mountain village remains.

=== Surrounding municipalities ===
Saitama Prefecture

- Higashimatsuyama
- Moroyama
- Ogose
- Ranzan
- Sakado
- Tokigawa

=== Climate ===
Hatoyama has a humid subtropical climate (Köppen Cfa) characterized by warm summers and cool winters with light to no snowfall. The average annual temperature in Hatoyama is 13.8 °C. The average annual rainfall is 1746 mm with September as the wettest month. The temperatures are highest on average in August, at around 25.4 °C, and lowest in January, at around 2.3 °C.

Climate data for Hatoyama (1991−2020 normals, extremes 1977−present)
Month	Jan	Feb	Mar	Apr	May	Jun	Jul	Aug	Sep	Oct	Nov	Dec	Year
Record high °C (°F)	19.9 (67.8)	24.8 (76.6)	26.2 (79.2)	32.3 (90.1)	35.8 (96.4)	39.4 (102.9)	40.1 (104.2)	41.4 (106.5)	38.5 (101.3)	32.6 (90.7)	27.6 (81.7)	25.7 (78.3)	41.4 (106.5)
Mean daily maximum °C (°F)	9.7 (49.5)	10.6 (51.1)	14.0 (57.2)	19.6 (67.3)	24.2 (75.6)	26.7 (80.1)	30.6 (87.1)	32.1 (89.8)	27.6 (81.7)	21.9 (71.4)	16.6 (61.9)	12.0 (53.6)	20.5 (68.9)
Daily mean °C (°F)	2.6 (36.7)	3.8 (38.8)	7.5 (45.5)	12.8 (55.0)	17.8 (64.0)	21.4 (70.5)	25.2 (77.4)	26.3 (79.3)	22.3 (72.1)	16.4 (61.5)	10.2 (50.4)	4.8 (40.6)	14.3 (57.7)
Mean daily minimum °C (°F)	−4.0 (24.8)	−2.8 (27.0)	0.9 (33.6)	6.2 (43.2)	11.8 (53.2)	16.9 (62.4)	21.1 (70.0)	22.1 (71.8)	18.3 (64.9)	11.8 (53.2)	4.5 (40.1)	−1.5 (29.3)	8.8 (47.8)
Record low °C (°F)	−10.7 (12.7)	−10.2 (13.6)	−9.0 (15.8)	−4.9 (23.2)	0.9 (33.6)	7.5 (45.5)	12.4 (54.3)	14.1 (57.4)	6.8 (44.2)	1.1 (34.0)	−4.6 (23.7)	−9.5 (14.9)	−10.7 (12.7)
Average precipitation mm (inches)	39.2 (1.54)	35.2 (1.39)	75.0 (2.95)	96.4 (3.80)	111.4 (4.39)	167.8 (6.61)	179.3 (7.06)	187.0 (7.36)	218.5 (8.60)	183.1 (7.21)	56.6 (2.23)	36.1 (1.42)	1,377.4 (54.23)
Average precipitation days (≥ 1.0 mm)	3.7	4.2	7.8	8.5	9.7	13.0	12.5	10.3	12.0	9.6	6.0	4.0	101.3
Mean monthly sunshine hours	197.8	185.1	184.4	180.4	179.6	122.5	139.1	172.3	128.5	134.4	157.6	180.8	1,958.8
Source: JMA

== Demographics ==
Per Japanese census data, the population of Hatoyama increased rapidly in the 1970s and 1980s before peaking around the year 2000. It has been in decline since then.

Historical population
Year	Pop.	±%
1920	4,553	—
1930	4,632	+1.7%
1940	4,599	−0.7%
1950	5,502	+19.6%
1960	4,974	−9.6%
1970	4,634	−6.8%
1980	10,301	+122.3%
1990	16,812	+63.2%
2000	17,008	+1.2%
2010	15,305	−10.0%
2020	13,560	−11.4%

== History ==
The village of Hatoyama was created on April 15, 1955, by the merger of the villages of Kamei and Imajuku. It was raised to town status on April 1, 1982.

== Government ==
Hatoyama has a mayor-council form of government with a directly elected mayor and a unicameral town council of 12 members. Hatoyama, together with the towns of Ogose and Moroyama, contributes one member to the Saitama Prefectural Assembly. In terms of national politics, the town is part of Saitama 10th district of the lower house of the Diet of Japan.

== Economy ==
The economy of Hatoyama is primarily agricultural, with rice predominating. Hitachi has a research facility located in Hatoyama.

== Education ==
- Tokyo Denki University – Hatoyama campus
- Yamamura Gakuen College
- Hatoyama has three public elementary schools and one public middle school operated by the town government, and one public high school operated by the Saitama Prefectural Board of Education.

== Transportation ==
Hatoyama is not on any passenger train network or national highway. The nearest train station is Takasaka in neighboring Higashimatsuyama. The nearest highway access point is the Tsurugashima Interchange on the Kan-Etsu Expressway in neighboring Tsurugashima.
