= Sakado =

Saitama Ken Sakado shi minami_cho 16_12 mansion 301 350_0233 Sakado Saitama

Sakado 坂戸市
- City
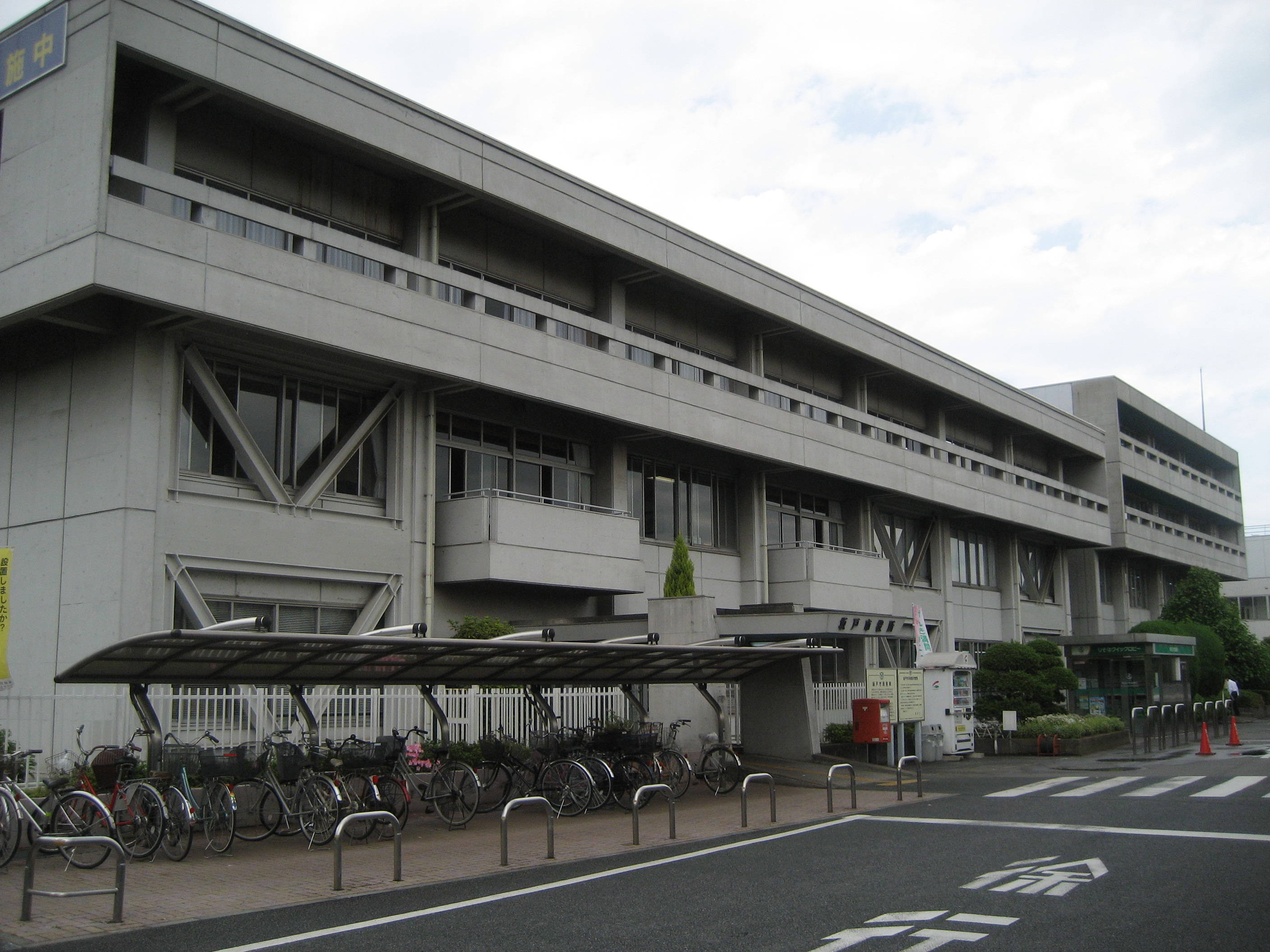
- Sakado city hall

- Flag Seal

- Location of Sakado in Saitama Prefecture

- Coordinates: 35°57′26.1″N 139°24′10.9″E
- Country: Japan
- Region: Kantō
- Prefecture: Saitama

Area
  - Total: 41.02 km^{2} (15.84 sq mi)

Population (January 2021)
  - Total: 100,612
  - Density: 2,453/km^{2} (6,353/sq mi)
- Time zone: UTC+9 (Japan Standard Time)
- Tree: Sakura
- Flower: Satsuki azalea
- Phone number: 049-283-1331
- Address: 1-1-1 Chiyoda, Sakado-shi, Saitama-ken 350-0292
- Website: Official website

Sakado (坂戸市, Sakado-shi) is a city in Saitama Prefecture, Japan. As of 1 January 2021, the city had an estimated population of 100,612 in 46,735 households and a population density of 2500 persons per km^{2}. The total area of the city is 41.02 square kilometres (15.84 sq mi).

== Geography ==
Sakado is located in the geographic center of Saitama Prefecture, about 40 kilometers from downtown Tokyo. The terrain is generally flat. The Koma River flows from the southwest to the northeast of the city.

=== Surrounding municipalities ===
Saitama Prefecture

- Hatoyama
- Hidaka
- Higashimatsuyama
- Kawagoe
- Kawajima
- Moroyama
- Tsurugashima

=== Climate ===
Sakado has a humid subtropical climate (Köppen Cfa) characterized by warm summers and cool winters with light to no snowfall. The average annual temperature in Sakado is 14.6 °C. The average annual rainfall is 1382 mm with September as the wettest month. The temperatures are highest on average in August, at around 26.5 °C, and lowest in January, at around 3.7 °C.

== Demographics ==
Per Japanese census data, the population of Sakado has increased rapidly towards the end of the 20th century due to new town developments. It has since leveled off.

Historical population
Year	Pop.	±%
1950	23,682	—
1960	23,569	−0.5%
1970	27,308	+15.9%
1980	77,335	+183.2%
1990	95,740	+23.8%
2000	97,381	+1.7%
2010	101,700	+4.4%
2020	100,275	−1.4%

== History ==
Sakado-juku was a post station on the Nikkō Wakiōkan highway connecting Hachiōji with Nikkō from the Muromachi period onwards. During the late Edo period and early Meiji period, the area was noted for sericulture. The village of Sakado was created within Iruma District, Saitama with the establishment of the modern municipalities system on April 1, 1889, and was elevated to city status on December 10, 1896. On July 1, 1954, Sakado annexed the neighboring villages of Miyoshino, Issai, Oya and Suguro. On September 1, 1976, Sakado was elevated to city status.

== Government ==
Sakado has a mayor-council form of government with a directly elected mayor and a unicameral city council of 22 members. Sakado contributes one member to the Saitama Prefectural Assembly. In terms of national politics, the city is part of Saitama 10th district of the lower house of the Diet of Japan.

== Economy ==
Sakado is a regional commercial center with some light and precision manufacturing and food processing, and is increasingly a commuter town for Tokyo Metropolis.

== Education ==
=== Universities ===
- Josai University
- Josai Junior College
- Kagawa Nutrition University
- Meikai University School of Dentistry

=== High schools ===
- Sakado High School
- Sakado Nishi High School
- Senior High School at Sakado, University of Tsukuba
- Yamamura International High School

=== Elementary and junior high schools ===
Sakado has 11 public elementary schools and seven public middle schools operated by the city government, and two public high schools operated by the Saitama Prefectural Board of Education. There is also one national high school and one private high school. The prefecture also operates one special education school for the handicapped.

== Transportation ==
=== Railway ===
Tōbu Railway - Tōbu Tōjō Line

- Wakaba - Sakado – Kita-Sakado

Tōbu Railway - Tobu Ogose Line

- Nishi-Ōya

=== Highway ===
- Ken-Ō Expressway – Sakado Interchange
- Kan-etsu Expressway – Sakado-Nishi Smart Interchange
- National Route 1

== Sister cities ==
- Dothan, Alabama, United States, since March 1988

== City mascot ==
The city mascot "Sakacchi" (さかっち) was created in 2006 to mark the 30th anniversary of Sakado gaining city status.

== Local attractions ==
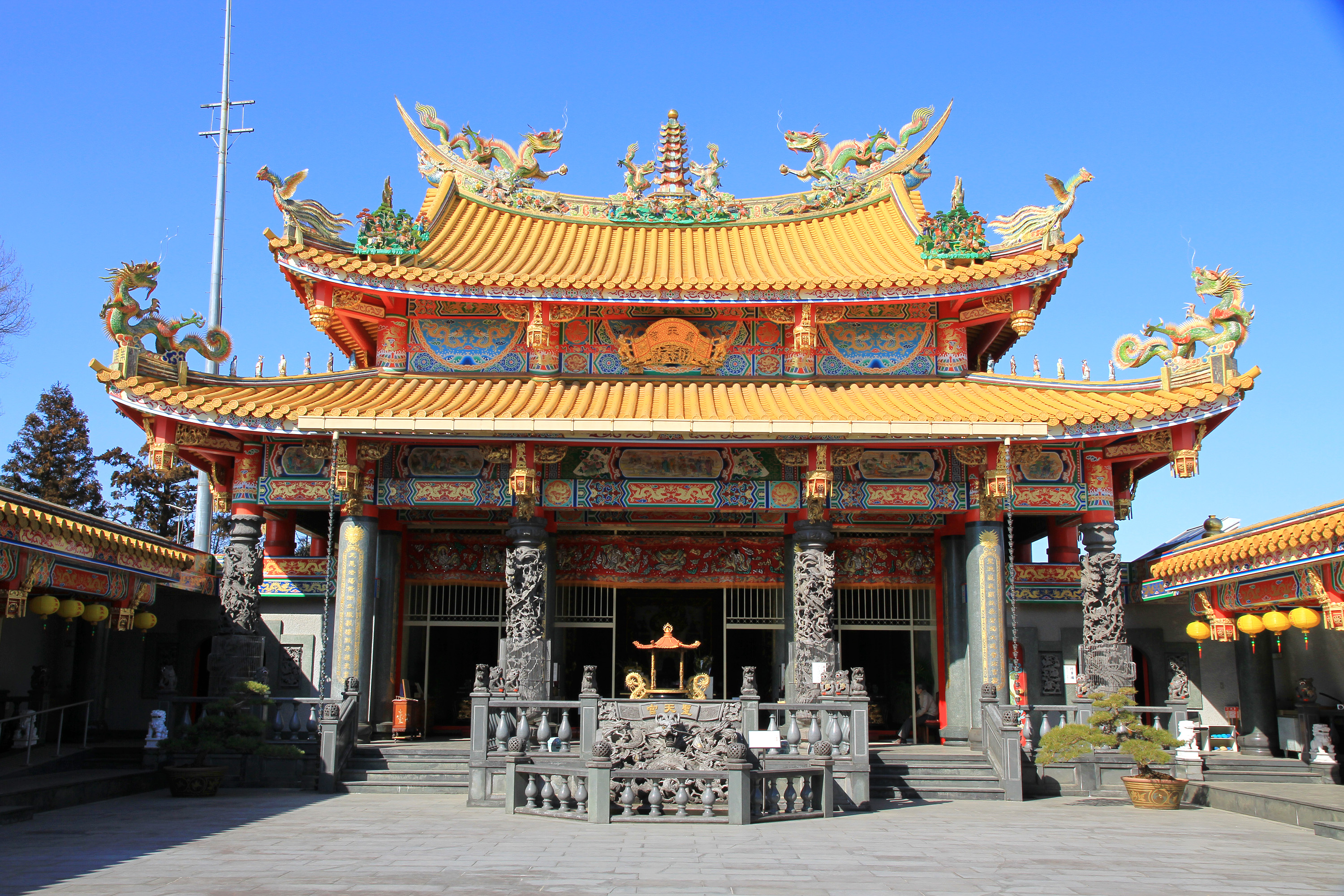
Sakado Xien Ten Gong

- Xien Ten Gong, the largest Taoist temple in Japan, is located in Sakado.
- Yosakoi festival held annually in Sakado in August since 2001.

== Notable people from Sakado ==
- Takaki Horigome, musician, Kirinji
- Yasuyuki Horigome, musician, Kirinji
