= Toshi Maruki =

Japanese painter

Toshi Maruki (Toshiko Akamatsu in 1947)
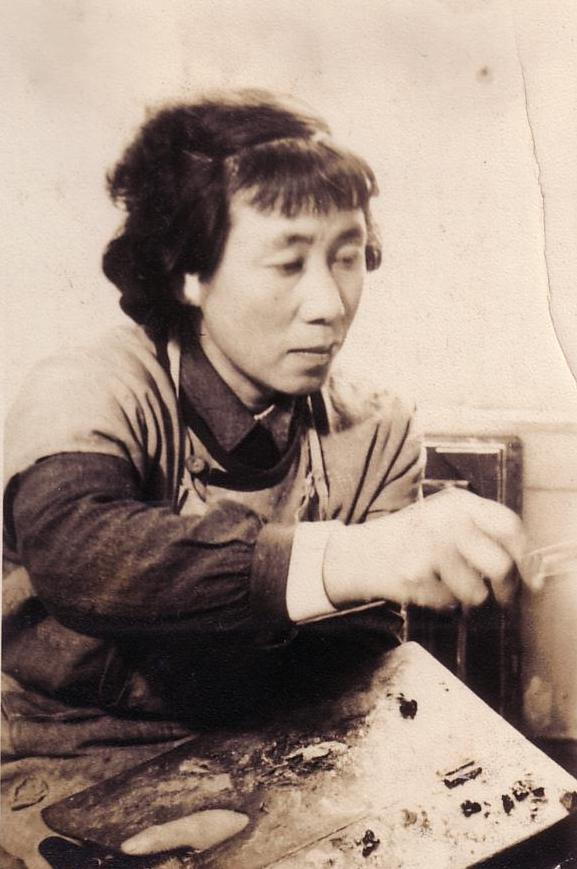

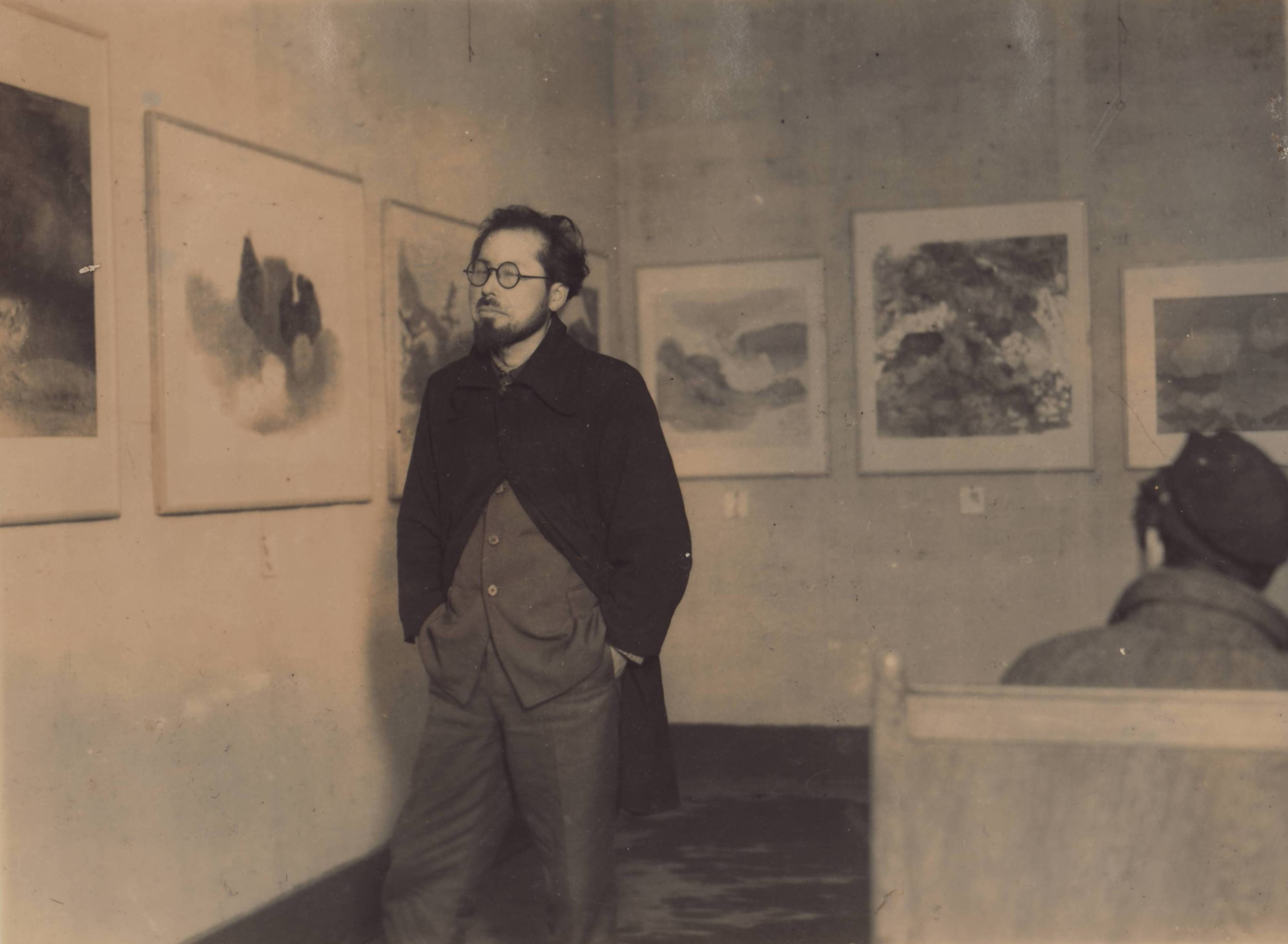
Iri Maruki, Toshi's husband

Toshi Maruki (丸木俊, Maruki Toshi ; born Akamatsu Toshi, 赤松俊, on February 11, 1912, in Hokkaido, died on January 13, 2000, in Saitama; also known as Akamatsu Toshiko, 赤松俊子) was a Japanese painter. Maruki is best known for the Hiroshima Panels (Genbaku no zu) series that she and her husband Iri Maruki (丸木位里, 1901–1995) produced collaboratively from around 1950. The Marukis took on heavy themes such as the atomic bomb, genocide, and environmental pollution, and constantly voiced their anti-war and peace message through their art. Toshi Maruki is also known as an accomplished picture book author.

== Early life and education ==
Toshi Maruki was born on 11 February 1912 in Chippubetsu, Uryū District, Hokkaido, Japan. Her parents’ house was a temple. After graduating from Asahikawa Women’s Higher School, she moved to Tokyo and studied oil painting at the Teaching Department of the Women’s School of Fine Arts (present Joshibi University of Art and Design). After completing her degree at the Women’s School of Fine Arts, Maruki became a substitute teacher at the Ichikawa Municipal Higher Elementary School in Chiba Prefecture from 1933 to 1937.

== Moscow and Micronesia ==
From 1937 to 1938, Maruki was transferred to Moscow as a private tutor to the child of diplomats, through the recommendation from her colleague at the Ichikawa Municipal Higher Elementary School, Fumiko Hirano. According to Yukiko Yokoyama, "This coincided with Stalin’s Great Purge, but she was isolated from such horrors, and during this peaceful life, surrounded by clear rivers and white birch groves, she succeeded in producing one sketch a day." After returning to Japan in 1938, Maruki worked again as a substitute teacher at Ichikawa Municipal Higher Elementary School from spring until August, and then lived in the artists’ community, Ikebukuro Montparnasse in Tokyo. In the same year, Maruki held her first solo exhibition at Kinokuniya in Ginza, and in 1939 she was accepted to exhibit in the Nika Art Exhibition for the first time.

From January 1940, Maruki spent six months travelling alone across the Palau and Yap islands of Micronesia in the South Seas Mandate, then under Japanese rule. In Micronesia, Maruki came to know Hisakatsu Hijikata (土方久功, 1900-1977), a sculptor and folklorist who was already living there for many years. "Taking inspiration from the nature of the tropics, the coral reef seas and the lifestyles of the islanders, [Maruki] produced several oil paintings characterised by bold lines and colours." Returning home, she met the Hiroshima-born artist Iri Maruki in September 1940.

In 1941 Toshi Maruki was sent again to Moscow for six months as a private tutor to the child of the Japanese Counselor in Soviet Union, Haruhiko Nishi. Toshi Maruki produced war propaganda picture books for children based on her South Sea travels. Charlotte Eubanks has described Maruki’s practice as an art of persistence: “located somewhere in the messy and muddled gray area between complicity and resistance, persistence shares certain qualities with resilience: a commitment to not disappearing, a fierce act of continuing to take up space, quotidian survival as having its own resistant edge”.

In July 1941 she married Iri Maruki. After her marriage, she continued to use the name Toshiko Akamatsu (赤松俊子) until 1956. After the death of Iri’s mother, Suma Maruki (丸木スマ, 1875–1956), Toshi took the husband’s surname Maruki "to carry on the name of the female painter", and from 1957 to around 1964 Toshi was known as Toshiko Maruki (丸木俊子) for a while, but thereafter took the name Toshi Maruki (丸木俊). From 1942 to 1946, she exhibited at the Art and Culture Association (Bijutsu bunka kyōkai).

== The Hiroshima Panels ==
In August 1945, the US dropped atomic bombs on Hiroshima and Nagasaki. The Marukis heard the news that "a new kind of bomb had been dropped." Iri Maruki immediately travelled to his hometown of Hiroshima, and Toshi Maruki joined him there several days later. "There they were greeted with the sight of an unimaginable hell. They spent a month working on the relief effort and suffered from physical ailments for many years afterwards." After returning to Tokyo, they joined the Japanese Communist Party. In 1947, Toshi Maruki joined the Avant-Garde Art Association (Zen’ei bijutsu kai) where she exhibited her Emancipation of Humanity (Kaihō sarete iku ningeisei). In the same year, Maruki also joined the first exhibition of the Association of Women Painters (Joryū Gaka Kyōkai).

In February 1950, the Marukis presented their collaborative work, August 6th (Hachigatsu muika; later to be known as Ghosts or Yūrei, the first part of the Hiroshima Panels) at the 3rd Japan Indépendants Exhibition. In August, they created the second part (Fire, Hi) and the third part (Water, Mizu) of the Hiroshima Panels (Genbaku no zu), and held an exhibition of the tripart work at the Nihonbashi Maruzen and Ginza Mitsukoshi. At the same time, they published the picture book Pikadon. In October, they held the Exhibition of the Hiroshima Panels at Goryūso (Bakushinchi bunka kaikan), located south of the Atomic Bomb Dome in Hiroshima City. Despite the press code issued by the US Occupation forces and various other pressures by the US due to the outbreak of the Korean War, the Hiroshima Panels travelled around the country and played a role in informing many people about the damage caused by the atomic bombs, which was not widely reported at the time due to censorship.

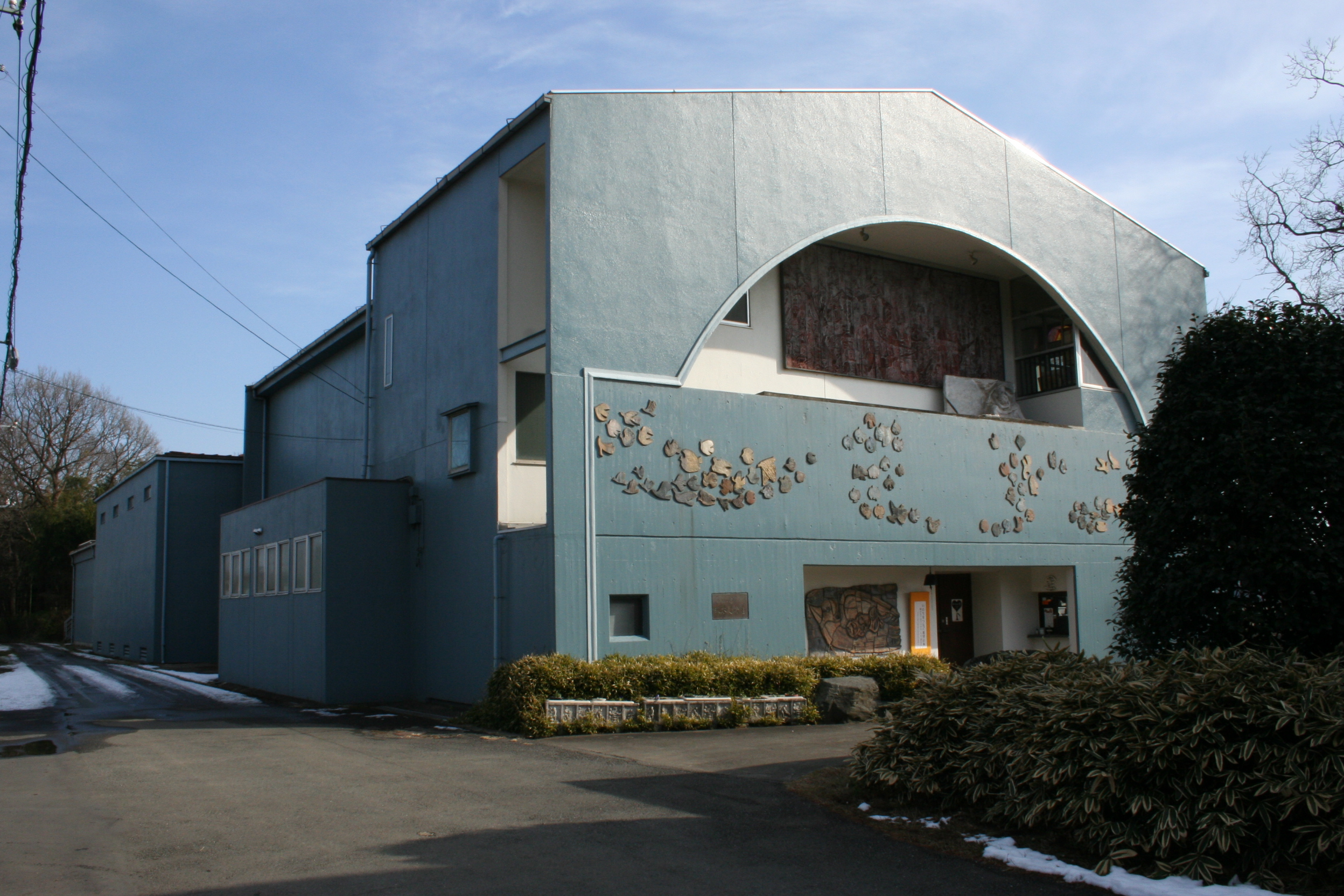
Maruki Gallery for the Hiroshima Panels in Higashimatsuyama, Saitama.

In January 1953, the Marukis received the International Peace Prize from the World Peace Council. In June of the same year, Toshi Maruki participated in the 2nd World Women's Congress in Copenhagen, with the trilogy of the Hiroshima Panels. The Marukis then participated in the World Peace Council in Budapest, where the Exhibition of the Hiroshima Panels was held at the National Art Gallery of Budapest for five days from 17 June. The exhibition then travelled to Beijing, Bucharest, and Copenhagen, before touring across the UK in 1955. In the pamphlet produced on that occasion, John Berger contributed a text on the Hiroshima Panels. The Exhibition of the Hiroshima Panels continued to be held in other parts of Europe including the Netherlands and Italy until touring East Asia and Oceania starting in 1956.

In 1966, the Marukis moved to Higashimatsuyama, Saitama, and in May the following year they opened the Maruki Gallery for the Hiroshima Panels. In 1970, the Exhibition of Hiroshima Panels was held in the US for the first time and toured the New School Art Centre in New York and other locations. When the Marukis travelled to the US in 1970 with the Hiroshima Panels, the US was bombing Vietnam and committed the My Lai massacre, and it was a great challenge for the Marukis and US organizers to exhibit the Hiroshima Panels in the US. In 1973 the Marukis were commissioned by the Hiroshima Peace Memorial Museum to create a mural (now in the collection of the Hiroshima City Museum of Contemporary Art).

Hiroshima panels displayed at the Stedelijk Museum in 1957.

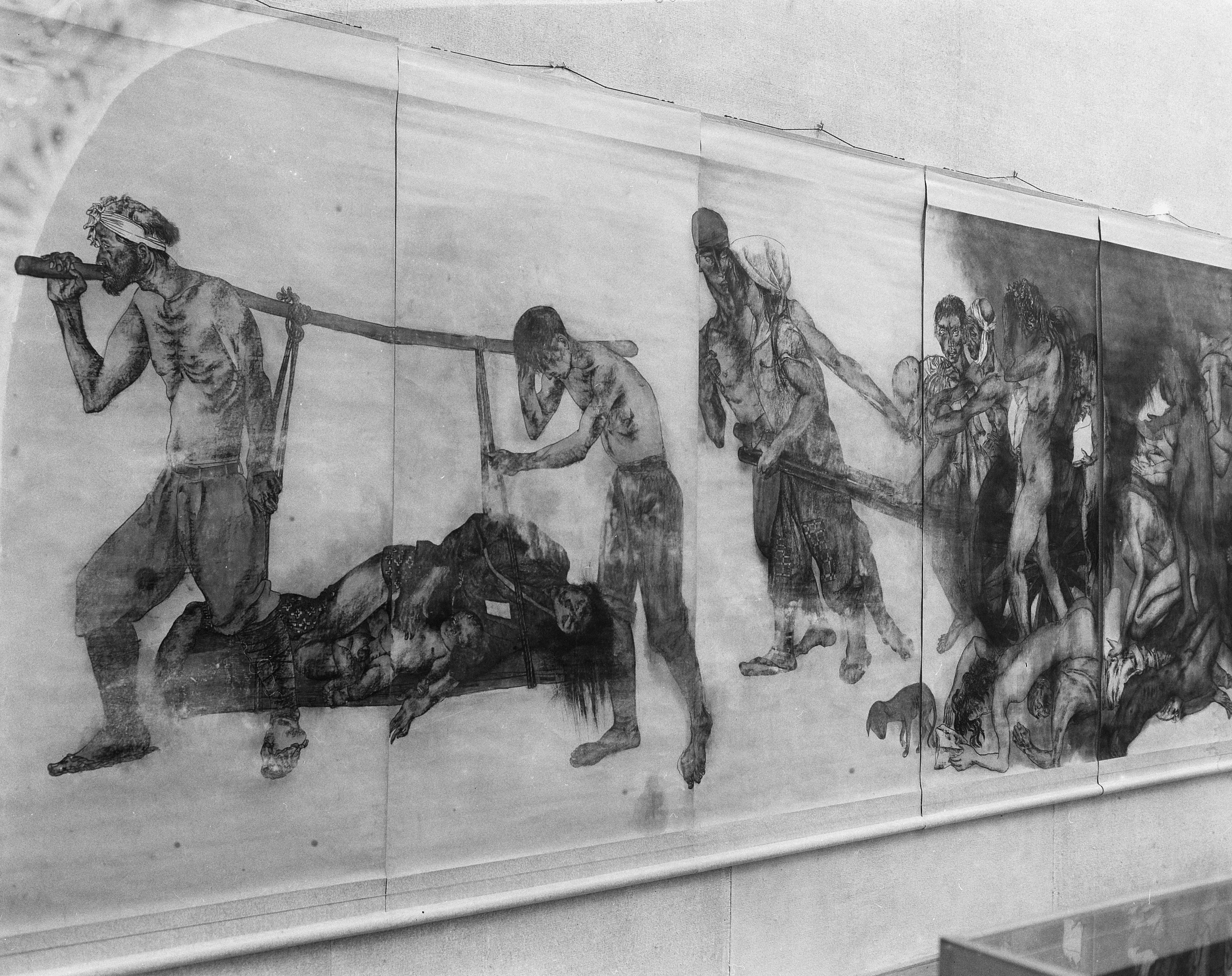

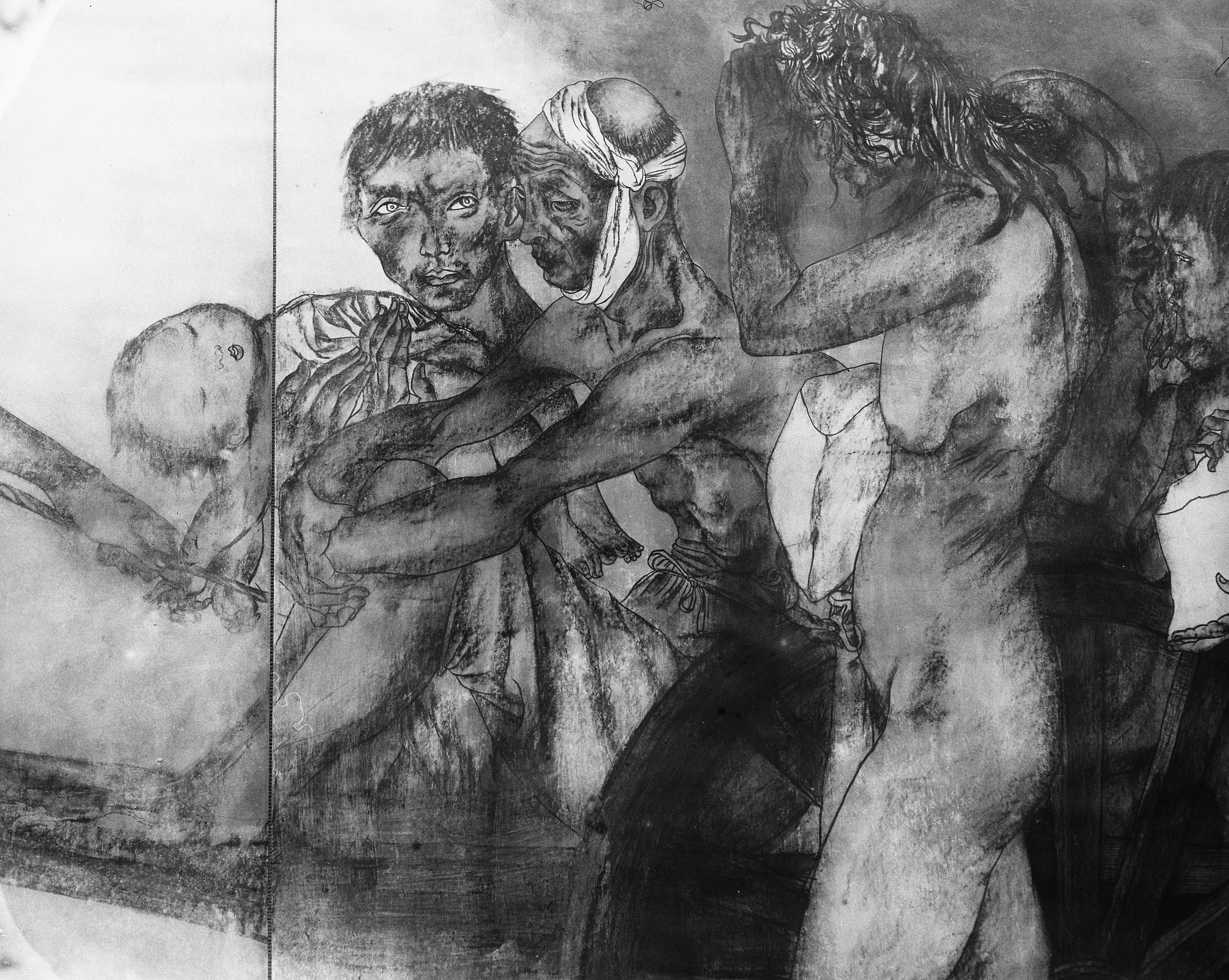

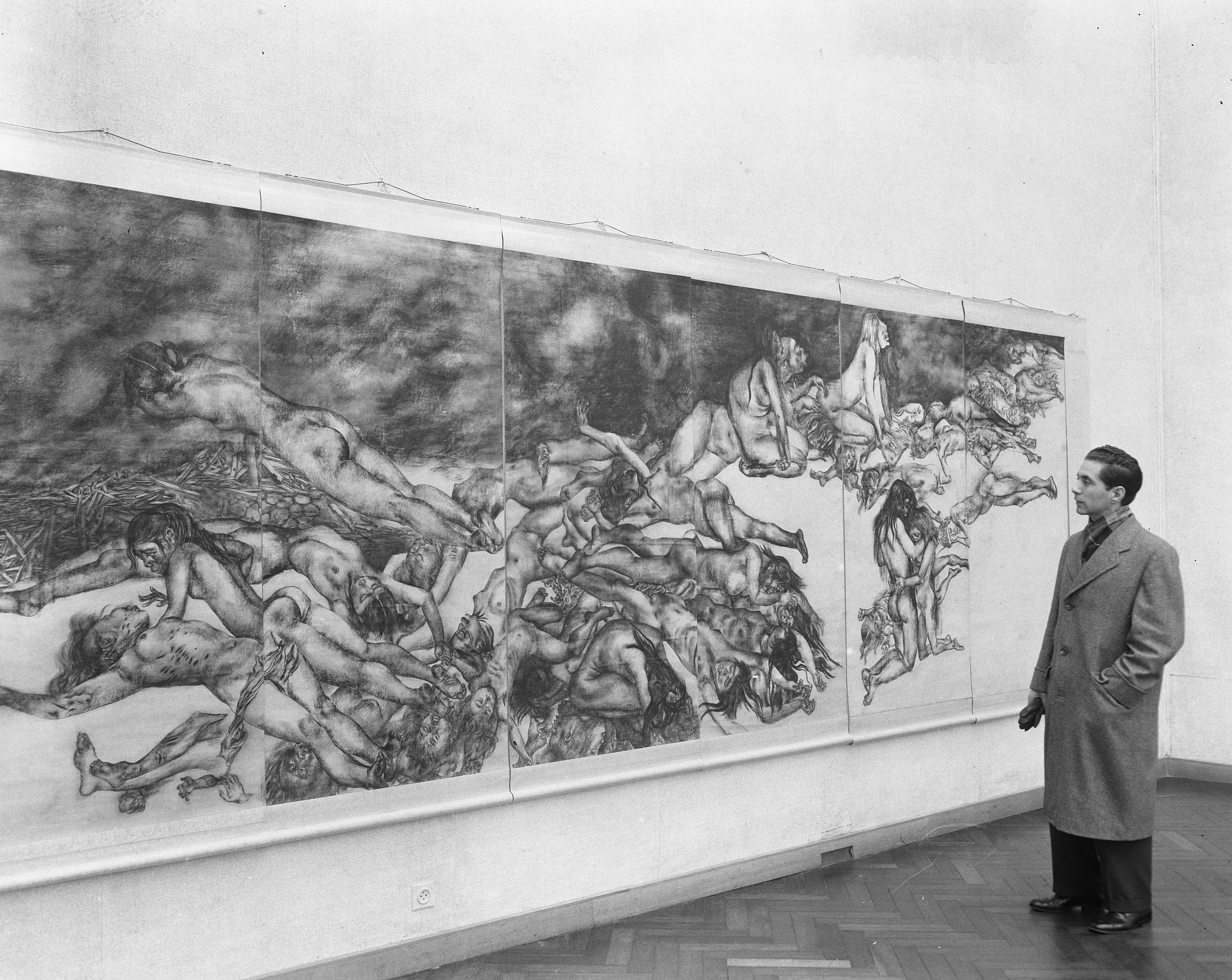

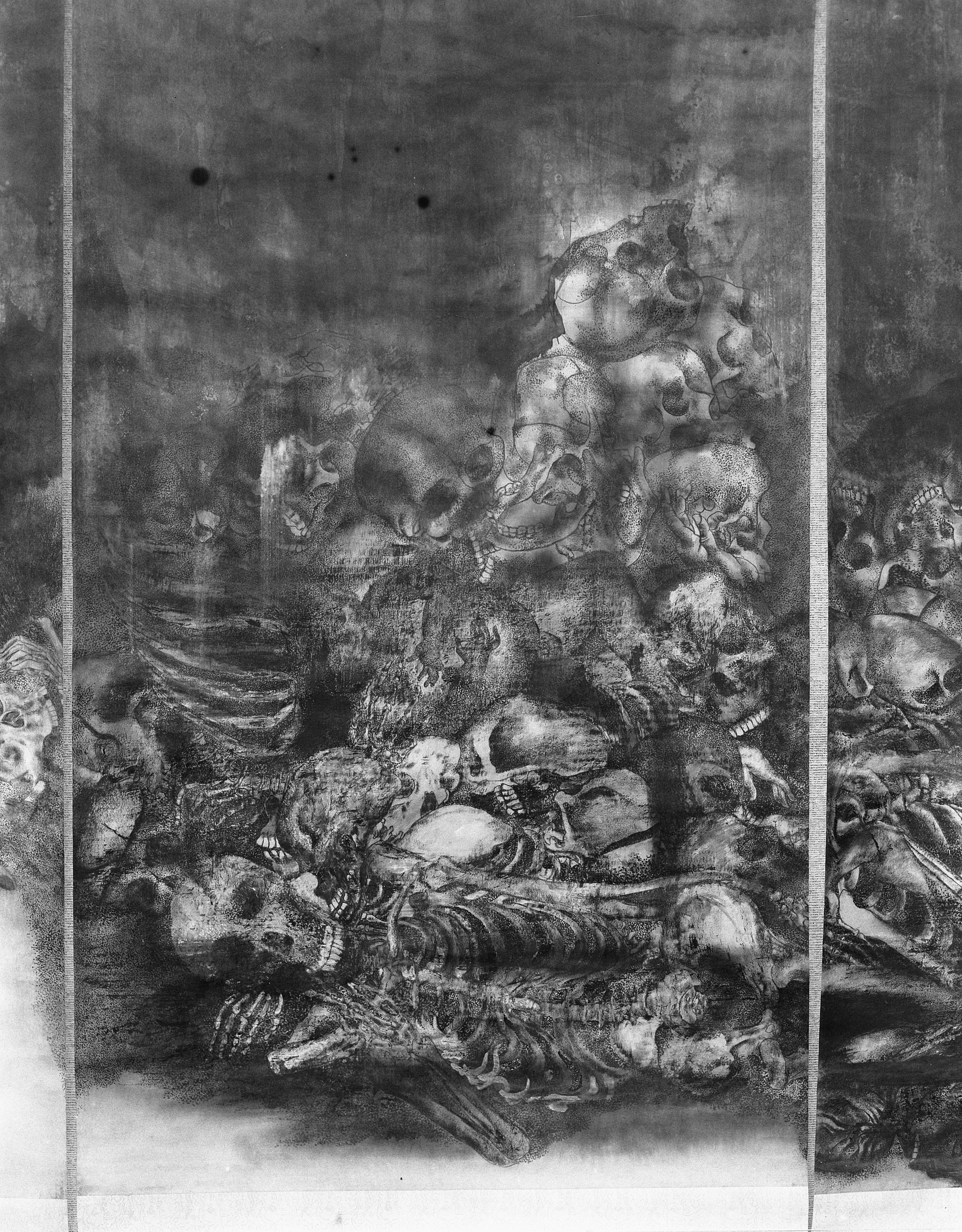

== After the Hiroshima Panels ==
During the US tour of the Hiroshima Panels, the Marukis were questioned by an American organiser at California State Polytechnic University: “What would you do if a Chinese painter came to Japan and said, 'I want to do an exhibition of works about the Nanjing Massacre’? That is like what we are doing,” and on their return they produced the Nanjing Massacre Panel (1975), which depicted the people of Nanjing massacred by the Japanese soldiers in 1937. The Marukis subsequently visited the Auschwitz concentration camp, and in 1977 they produced the Auschwitz Panel. In 1978, the Hiroshima Panels toured ten venues across France, where the Marukis were asked about Minamata Disease. At the time, they were not quite aware of the environmental pollution, but after returning to Japan, they visited Minamata, met the suffering people there and painted the Minamata Panel (1980).

In the 1980s, the Marukis became more fervently involved in the creation of picture books. For example, in 1980, Toshi Maruki also published the picture book Hiroshima no pika (Pika en Hiroŝima), later translated in 15 languages. In 1982, the Marukis published Minamata umi no koe (Voices of the Sea in Minamata) with text by Michiko Ishimure and illustrations by the Marukis’. In 1984 the couple published yet another picture book, Okinawatō no koe (Voices of Okinawana Island). In 1985, historian John W. Dower and filmmaker John Junkerman published the co-edited book Hiroshima Murals: The Art of Iri Maruki and Toshi Maruki.

== Recognition ==
In 1988, Toshi Maruki was awarded an honorary doctorate from the Massachusetts College of Art and Design, together with Iri Maruki. In 1995, Lawrence S. Wittner of the State University of New York at Albany recommended the Marukis to the selection committee as a candidate for the Nobel Peace Prize. In the same year, Toshi Maruki received the Avon Women's Grand Prize. Together with Iri Maruki, Toshi Maruki was awarded the Saitama Prefecture Citizens Medal of Honor and the Hiroshima City Municipal Citation for Meritorious Service.

In October 1995, Iri Maruki died at age 94, and in January 2000, Toshi Maruki died at age 87.

== Major public collections ==
- Hiroshima City Museum of Contemporary Art
- Hiroshima Prefectural Art Museum
- Hyogo Prefectural Museum of Art
- Maruki Gallery for the Hiroshima Panels
- National Museum of Modern Art, Tokyo

== Writing ==
- Akamatsu, Toshiko. E wa daredemo kakeru (絵ハ誰デモ描ケル). Tokyo: shinzenbi-sha, 1949.
- Akamatsu, Toshiko, and Maruki Iri. E wa daredemo kakeru (絵は誰でも描ける). Tokyo: Muromachi shobō, 1954.
- Maruki Toshiko, Seisei ruten (生々流転). Tokyo: Jitsugyaō no Nihon-sha, 1958.
- Maruki, Toshi. Onna ekaki no tanjō (女絵かきの誕生). Tokyo: Asahi shinbun-sha, 1977.
