= Nishi-Ōya Station =

Railway station in Sakado, Saitama Prefecture, Japan

TJ42 Nishi-Ōya Station 西大家駅
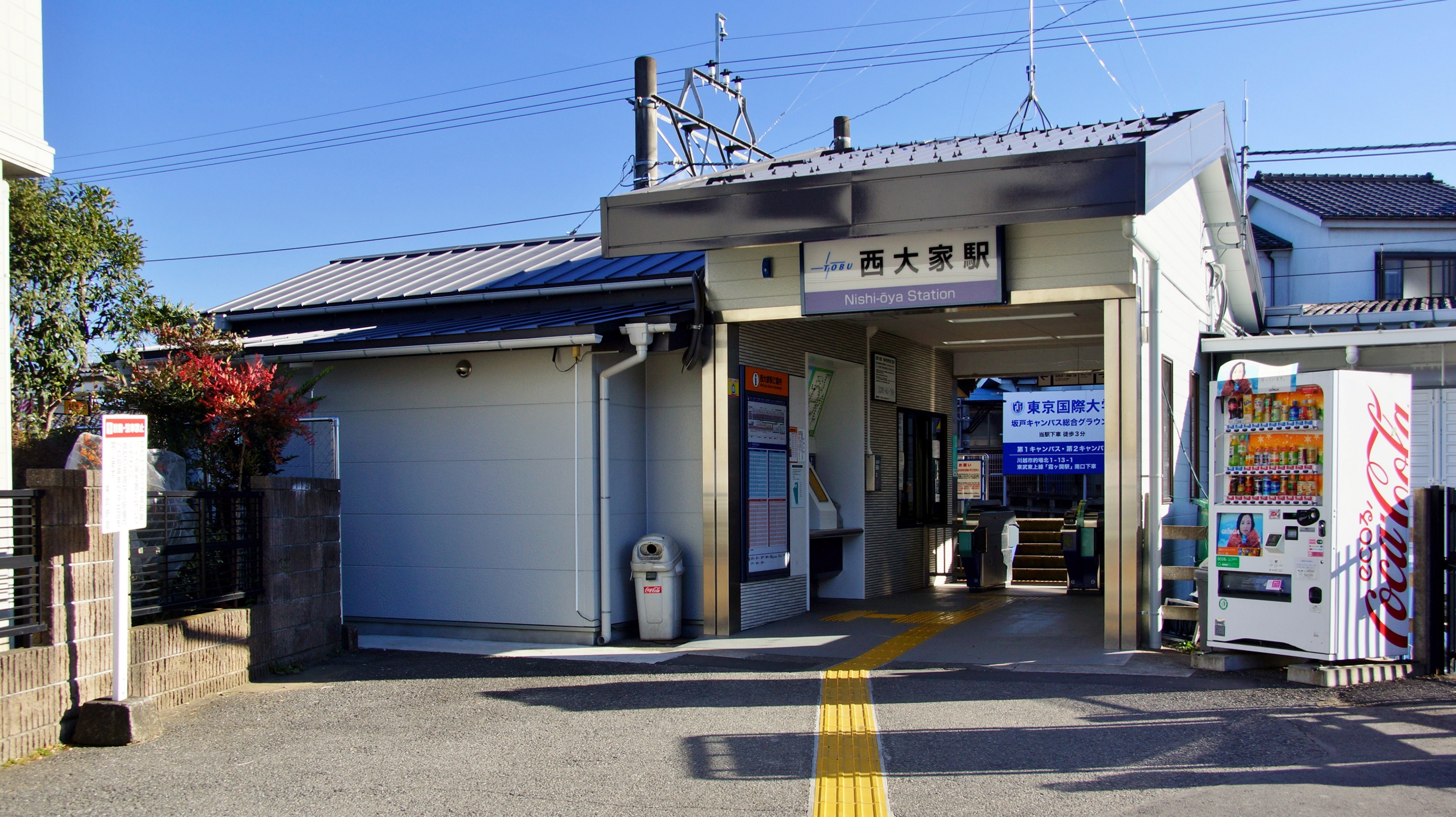
- Nishi-Ōya Station entrance in January 2014

General information
- Location: 623-7 Morito, Sakado-shi, Saitama-ken 350–0244; Japan
- Coordinates: 35.9315°N 139.3564°E
- Operator: Tōbu Railway
- Line: Tōbu Ogose Line
- Distance: 4.4 km from Sakado
- Platforms: 1 side platform
- Tracks: 1

Other information
- Station code: TJ-42
- Website: Official website

History
- Opened: 28 February 1936

Passengers
- FY2019: 3,981 daily

Services
Preceding station	Tobu Railway	Following station
Kawakado TJ43 towards Ogose	Ogose Line	Ippommatsu TJ41 towards Sakado
Location
- Location within Saitama Prefecture Location within Japan

Nishi-Ōya Station (西大家駅, Nishi Ōya-eki) is a passenger railway station located in the city of Sakado, Saitama, Japan, operated by the private railway operator Tōbu Railway.

== Lines ==
Nishi-Ōya Station is served by the Tōbu Ogose Line, a 10.9 km single-track branchline running from Sakado to Ogose, and is located 4.4 km from Sakado. During the daytime, the station is served by four trains per hour in each direction.

== Station layout ==
The station consists of a single side platform serving one bi-directional track.

A universal access toilet was added during fiscal 2012.

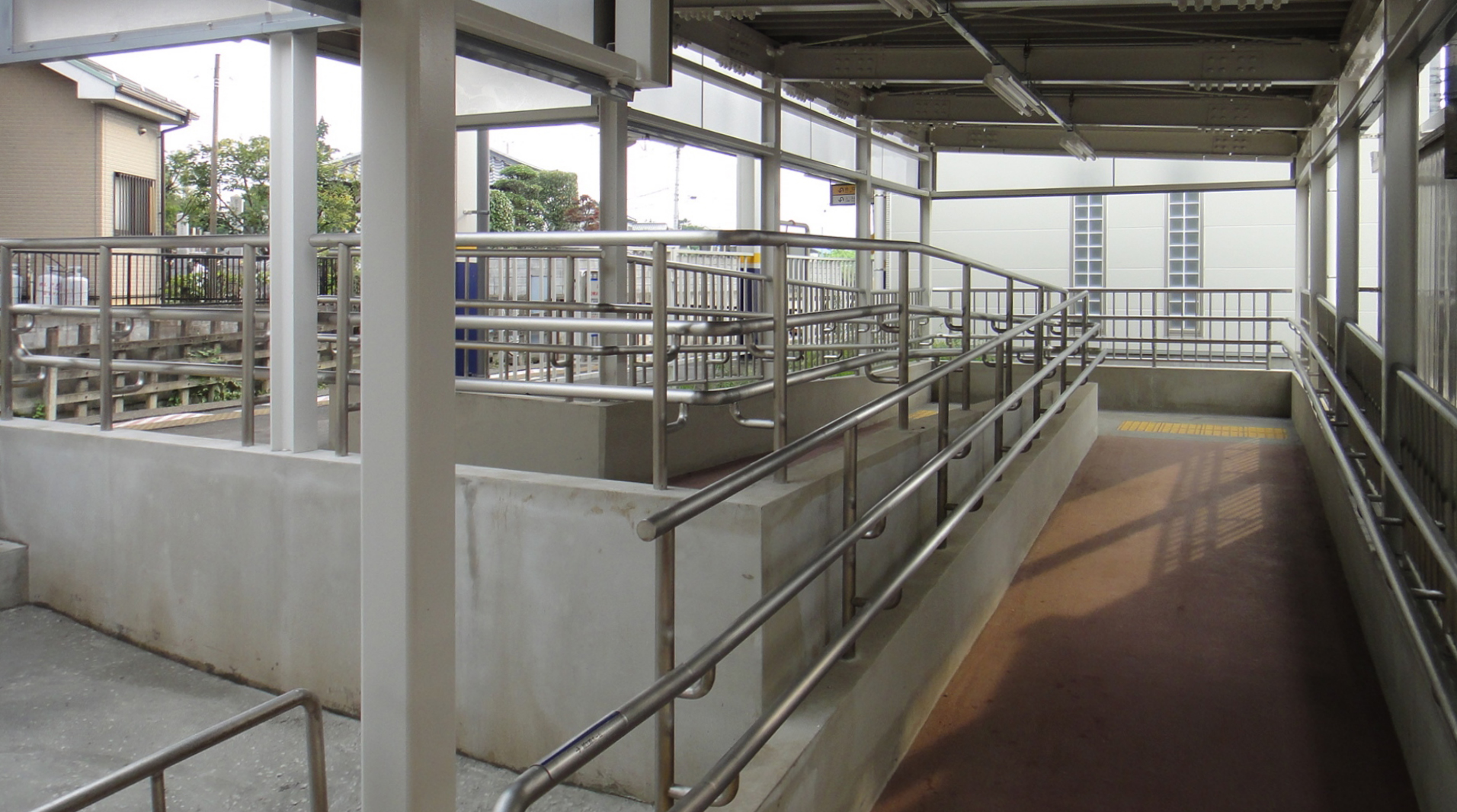
Wheelchair ramp providing access to the platform in July 2013

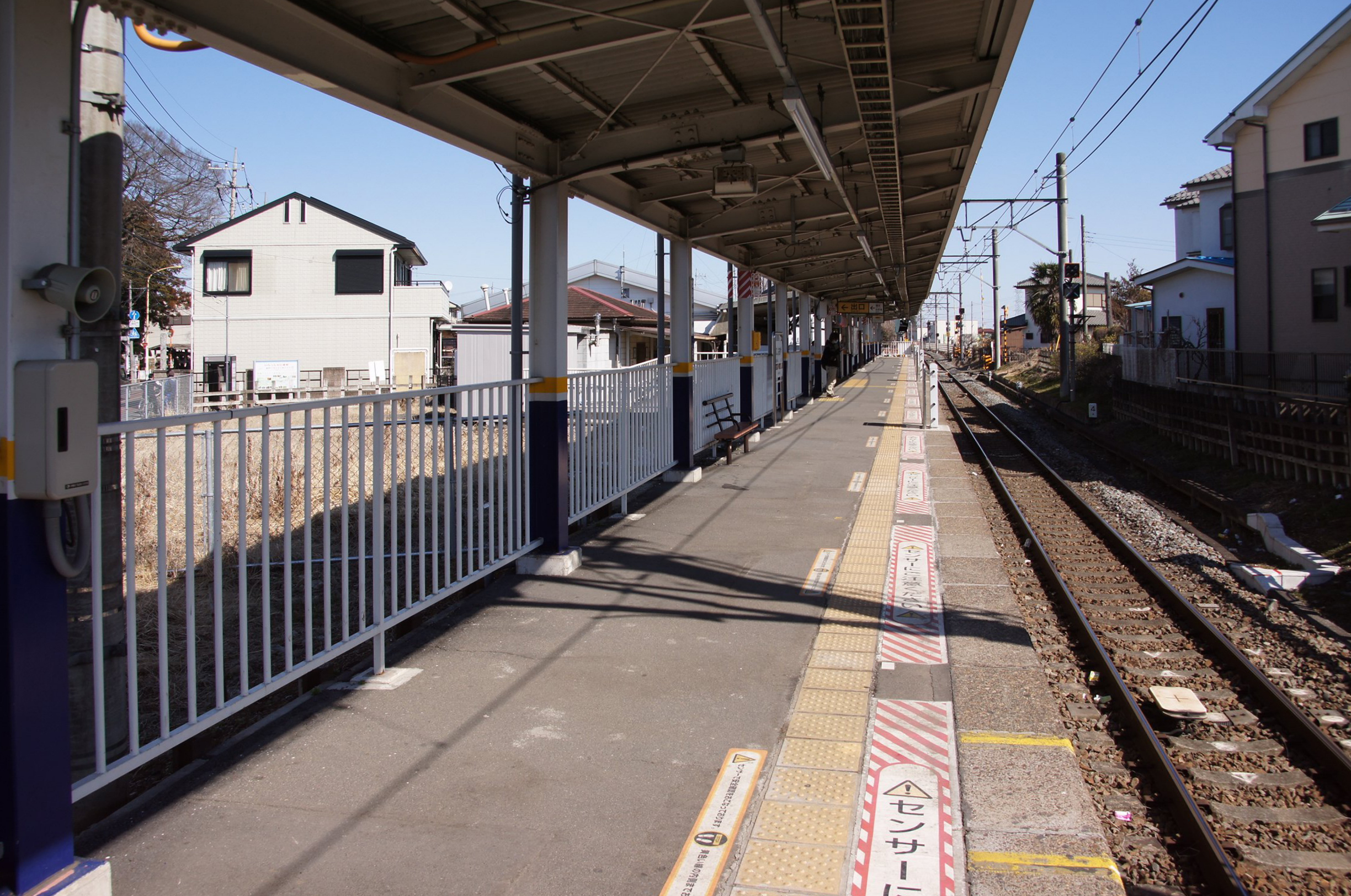
A view of the single platform looking toward Sakado in February 2012

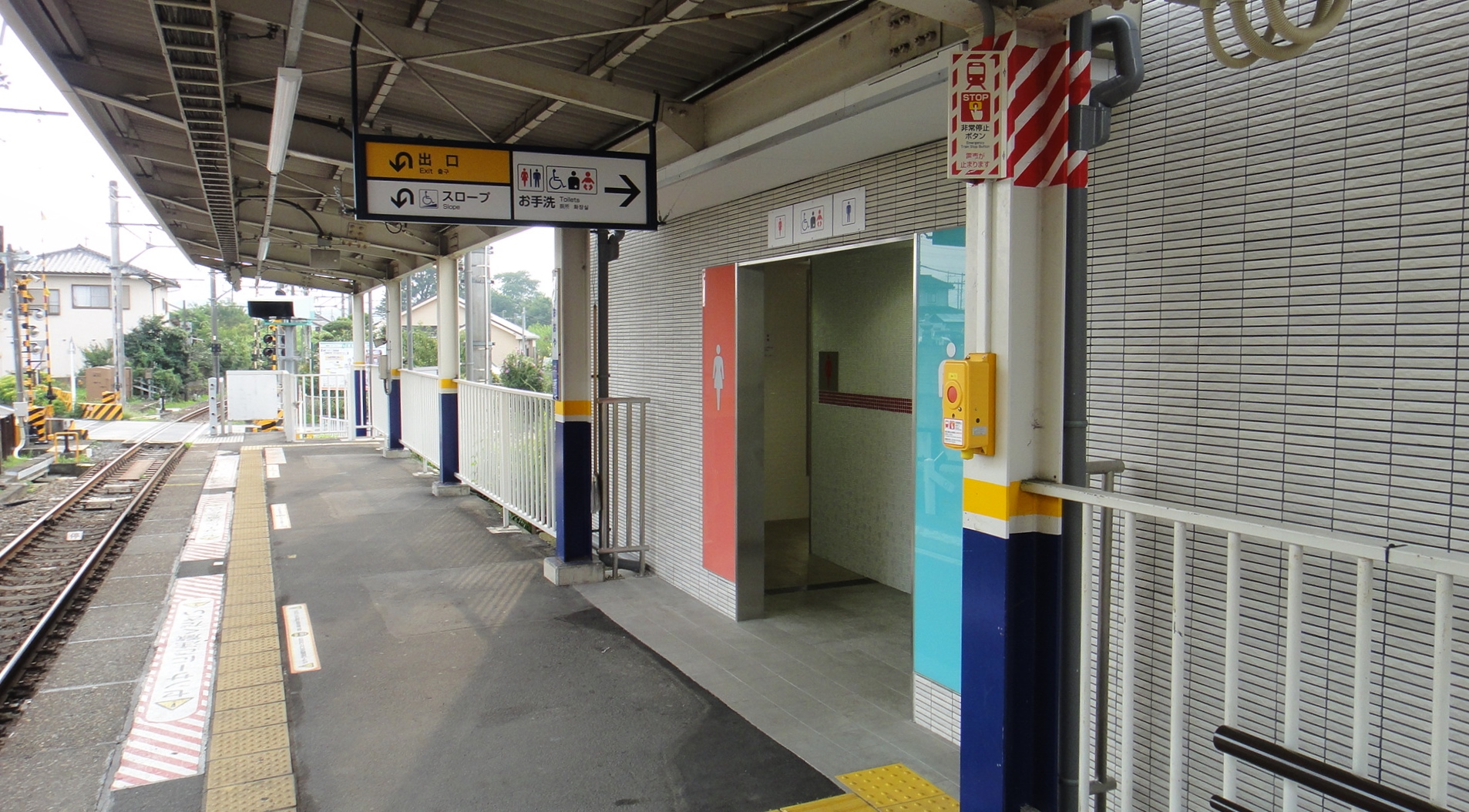
Toilet facilities on the platform in July 2013

== History ==
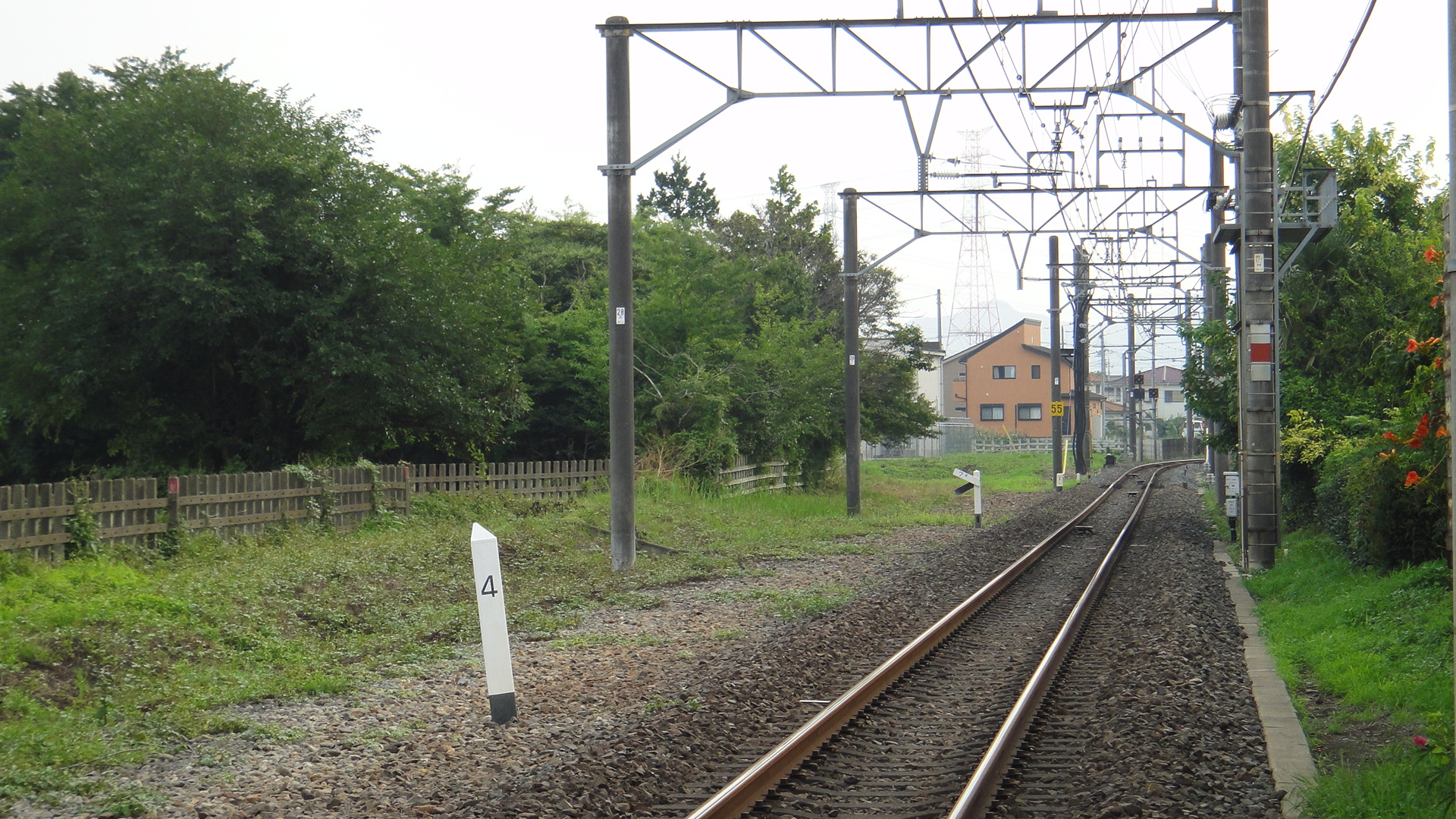
Site of the former Nishi-Oya Junction, with the trackbed of the former freight spur branching off to the left, July 2013

The station opened on 28 February 1936. It took its name from the village of Ōya (大家村), and lay to the west of Ōya Station, which closed in 1945.

A junction, "Nishi-Ōya Junction", was built to the east of the station in 1963 for a spur serving the Nippon Cement factory nearby, but this line closed in 1984.

Platform edge sensors and TV monitors were installed in 2008 ahead of the start of driver-only operation on the Ogose Line from June 2008. From 17 March 2012, station numbering was introduced on the Tobu Ogose Line, with Nishi-Ōya Station becoming "TJ-42".

== Passenger statistics ==
In fiscal 2019, the station was used by an average of 3,981 passengers daily.

== Surrounding area ==
Nishi-Ōya Station lies close to the boundary between Sakado and Tsurugashima cities.

- Tokyo International University Sakado campus
- Saitama Prefectural Sakado Nishi High School

== Bus services ==
Nishi-Ōya Station is served by the "Sakacchi Bus" (Ōya Line) community bus service operated by the city of Sakado.

== See also ==
- List of railway stations in Japan
