= Shufu no Tomo =

Japanese women's magazine (1917–2008)

- Categories: Women's magazine
- Frequency: Monthly
- Publisher: Shufu no Tomo Co. Ltd.
- Founder: Ishikawa Takemi
- Founded: 1917
- First issue: March 1917
- Final issue: 2008
- Country: Japan
- Based in: Tokyo
- Language: Japanese

Shufu no Tomo (主婦の友, Housewife's Friend) was a Japanese monthly women's magazine based in Tokyo, Japan. The magazine was in circulation between 1917 and 2008.

== History and profile ==
Shufu no Tomo was launched in 1917, and the first issue appeared in March 1917. The founding company was Tokyo Kaseikai. Its founder was Ishikawa Takemi. The magazine was published monthly by Shufu no Tomo Co. Ltd. in Tokyo. The size of the magazine was A5 until 1956 when it was switched to B5.

Shufu no Tomo had a conservative stance. It addressed young married women during the initial phase. At the same time its target audience was the mass market and lower-middle-class women. It covered articles about home management, including savings and birth control. In 2008 Shufu no Tomo ceased publication.

== Circulation ==
Shufu no Tomo had an estimated circulation of 200,000 copies in 1927. In 1931 its monthly circulation was 600,000 copies, and the magazine sold about 8 million copies. In 1952 it was the third best-selling and the third popular magazine in the country. Shufu no Tomo was one of four powerful and best-selling women's magazines in Japan in 1958. The other three were Fujin kurabu, Fujin seikatsu and Shufu to seikatsu with a combined circulation of 2,200,000 copies.
