= Yamamura Gakuen College =

Private junior college in Saitama, Japan

Coordinates: 35°59′49.7″N 139°21′27.6″E

Yamamura Gakuen College (山村学園短期大学, Yamamura gakuen tanki daigaku) is a private junior college in Hatoyama, Saitama, Japan, established in 1989. The predecessor of the school was founded in 1922.
