= Josai University =

Private university in Sakado, Saitama, Japan

- 城西大学
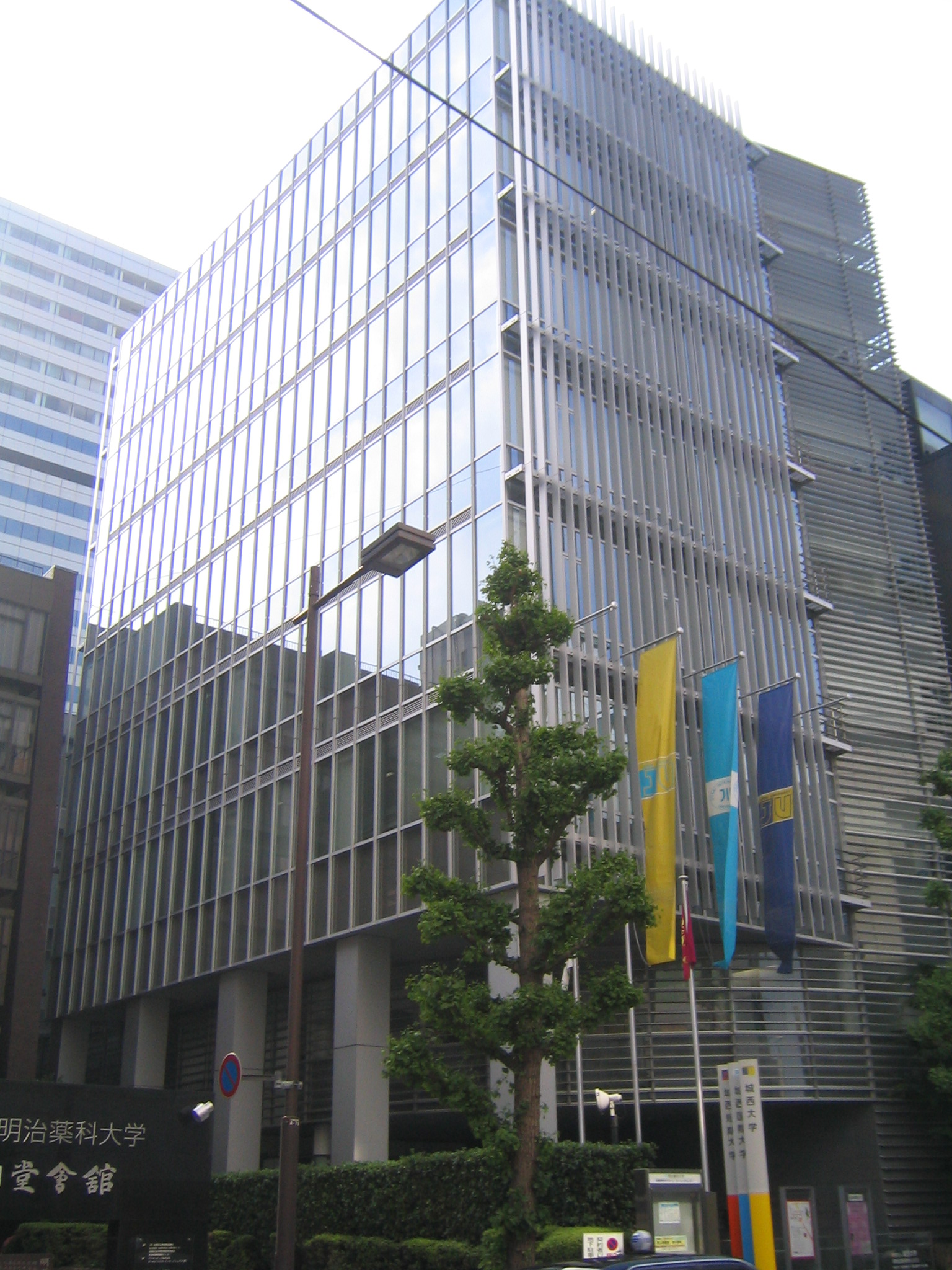
- Josai University, Tokyo Kioi-chō Campus
- Type: Private
- Established: 1965
- Location: Sakado, Saitama, Japan; 35.9326°N 139.3417°E
- Campus: Sakado Campus Tokyo Kioichō Campus
- Website: www.josai.ac.jp/english/

Josai University (城西大学, Jōsai Daigaku) is a private university in Sakado, Saitama, Japan, established in 1965. The predecessor of the school, Jōsai Gakuen Middle School, later Jōsai High School, was founded in 1918. The university is operated by the Josai University Educational Corporation, which was founded by the 17th Minister of Finance, Mikio Mizuta (1905–1976). Mizuta was Minister of Finance from 1960 to 1962, and then served as the first chancellor of Josai. The university opened with a Faculty of Economics and Faculty of Science. The Mizuta Museum of Art opened in 1976, and the graduate school of Josai University was established in 1977. The Josai University Educational Corporation also operates Josai International University, founded in 1992.

It is affiliated with Josai Junior College.

== Exchange programs ==
Josai University maintains exchange programs with the following five institutions.

- Camosun College, Victoria, British Columbia, Canada
- Tamkang University, Tamsui, New Taipei, Taiwan
- Dongseo University, Busan, South Korea
- Universiti Tunku Abdul Rahman, Perak, Malaysia
- Management and Science University, Selangor, Malaysia

== Notable alumni ==
Yuki Takamiya, long-distance runner
