= Higashimatsuyama =

Higashimatsuyama 東松山市
- City
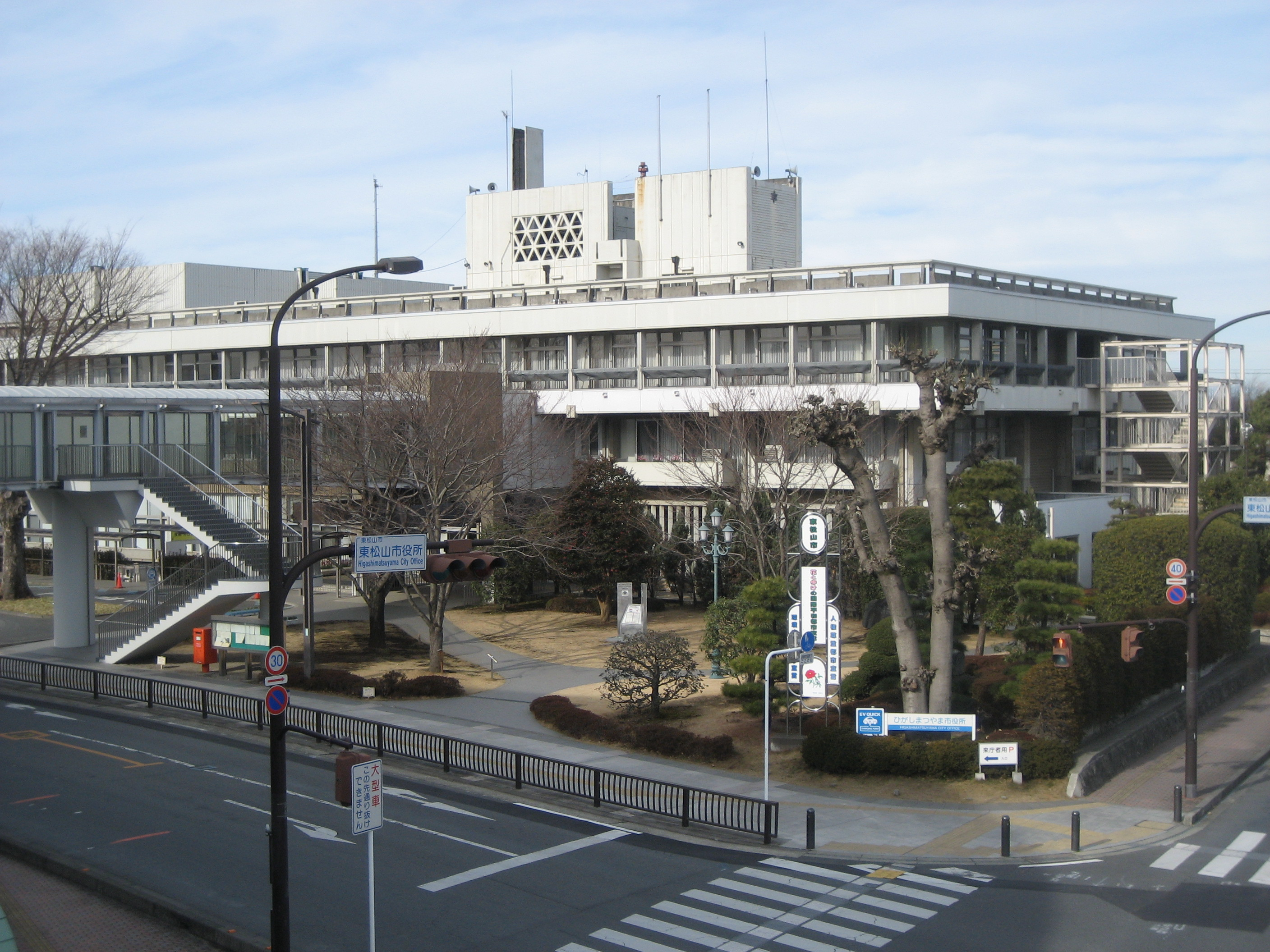
- Higashimatsuyama City Hall

- Flag Seal

- Location of Higashimatsuyama in Saitama Prefecture

- Coordinates: 36°2′31.8″N 139°23′59.7″E
- Country: Japan
- Region: Kantō
- Prefecture: Saitama
- First official recorded: 300AD (estimated)
- Musashi Matsuyama town settled: April 1, 1889
- Higashimatsuyama city settled: July 1, 1954

Government
  - Mayor: Yoshihiro Matsuzaka (松坂善浩) - from August 2026

Area
  - Total: 65.35 km^{2} (25.23 sq mi)

Population (January 2021)
  - Total: 90,456
  - Density: 1,384/km^{2} (3,585/sq mi)
- Time zone: UTC+9 (Japan Standard Time)
- Tree: Pinus
- Flower: Paeonia suffruticosa
- Phone number: 0493-23-2221
- Address: 1-1-58 Matsuba-cho, Higashimatsuyama-shi, Saitama-ken 355-8601
- Website: city.higashimatsuyama.lg.jp

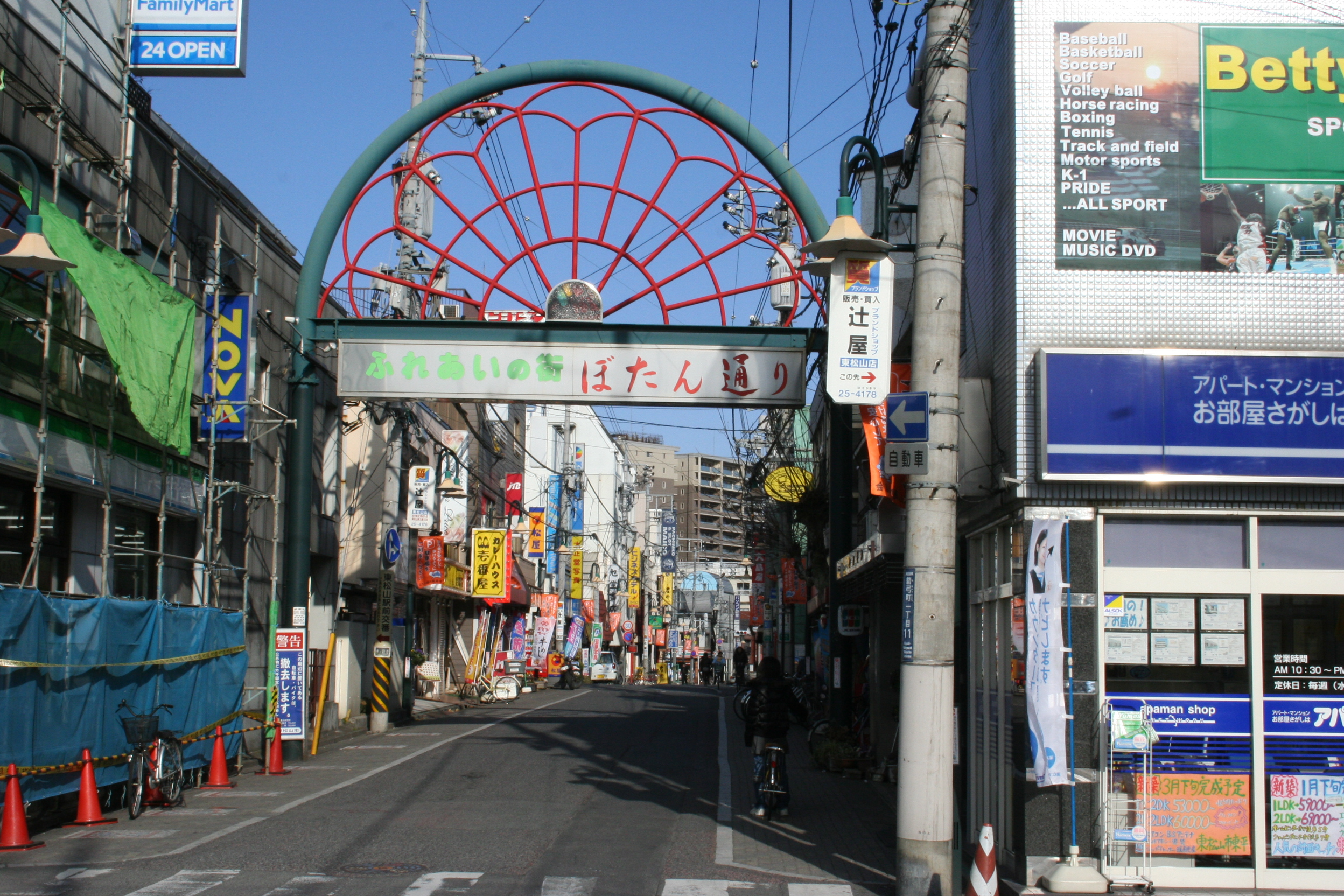
Higashimatsyma Botan-dori

Higashimatsuyama (東松山市, Higashimatsuyama-shi) is a city located in Saitama Prefecture, Japan. As of 1 January 2021, the city had an estimated population of 90,456 in 41,124 households and a population density of 1400 persons per km^{2}. The total area of the city is 65.33 km^{2} (25.22 sq mi).

== Geography ==
Higashimatsuyama is located in the geographic center of Saitama Prefecture.

=== Surrounding municipalities ===
Saitama Prefecture

- Hatoyama
- Kawajima
- Kumagaya
- Namegawa
- Ranzan
- Sakado
- Yoshimi

=== Climate ===
Higashimatsuyama has a humid subtropical climate (Köppen Cfa) characterized by warm summers and cool winters with light to no snowfall. The average annual temperature in Higashimatsuyama is 14.5 °C. The average annual rainfall is 1351 mm with September as the wettest month. The temperatures are highest on average in August, at around 26.6 °C, and lowest in January, at around 3.6 °C.

== Demographics ==
Per Japanese census data, the population of Higashimatsuyama has recently plateaued after a long period of growth.

Historical population
Year	Pop.	±%
1920	22,512	—
1930	24,904	+10.6%
1940	26,218	+5.3%
1950	36,099	+37.7%
1960	38,267	+6.0%
1970	50,383	+31.7%
1980	63,889	+26.8%
1990	84,394	+32.1%
2000	92,929	+10.1%
2010	90,099	−3.0%
2020	91,791	+1.9%

== History ==
Higashimatsuyama developed as a castle town from the Kamakura period, and was ruled as an outlier of Kawagoe Domain (later Maebashi Domain) during the Edo period Tokugawa shogunate. The town of Matsuyama was established within Hiki District, Saitama with the establishment of the modern municipalities system on April 1, 1889. Matsuyama merged with the villages of Ooka, Karako, Takasaka and Nomoto on July 1, 1954, and was elevated to city status as Higashimatsuyama.

== Government ==
Higashimatsuyama has a mayor-council form of government with a directly elected mayor and a unicameral city council of 21 members. Higashimatsuyama, together with the towns of Kawashima and Yoshimi, contributes two members to the Saitama Prefectural Assembly. In terms of national politics, the city is part of Saitama 11th district of the lower house of the Diet of Japan.

== Economy ==
Traditionally the economy of Higashimatsuyama was dominated by sericulture and silk weaving. Modern Higashimatsuyama has several industrial parks with a wide variety of light and medium manufacturing. Due to its geographic location, the city also serves as a bedroom community.

== Education ==
=== Universities ===
- Daito Bunka University – Higashimatsuyama campus

=== Primary and secondary education ===
- Higashimatsuyama has 11 public elementary schools and five public middle schools operated by the city government, and two public high schools operated by the Saitama Prefectural Board of Education. In addition, there is one private middle school and one private high school. The prefecture also operates one special education school for the handicapped.

== Transportation ==
=== Railway ===
Tobu Railway – Tobu Railway - Tōbu Tōjō Line

- Takasaka - Higashi-Matsuyama

=== Highway ===
- Kan-etsu Expressway – Higashimatsuyama IC, Takasaka SA
- National Route 254
- National Route 407

== Sister cities ==
- Nijmegen, Netherlands since 1996

== Local attractions ==
- Maruki Gallery for the Hiroshima Panels
- Peony Walk Higashimatsuyama
- Shobo-ji temple

== Noted people from Higshimatsuyama ==
- Takaaki Kajita (born 1959), Physicist and Nobel Laureate
