= Kagawa Nutrition University =

Private university in Japan

- 女子栄養大学
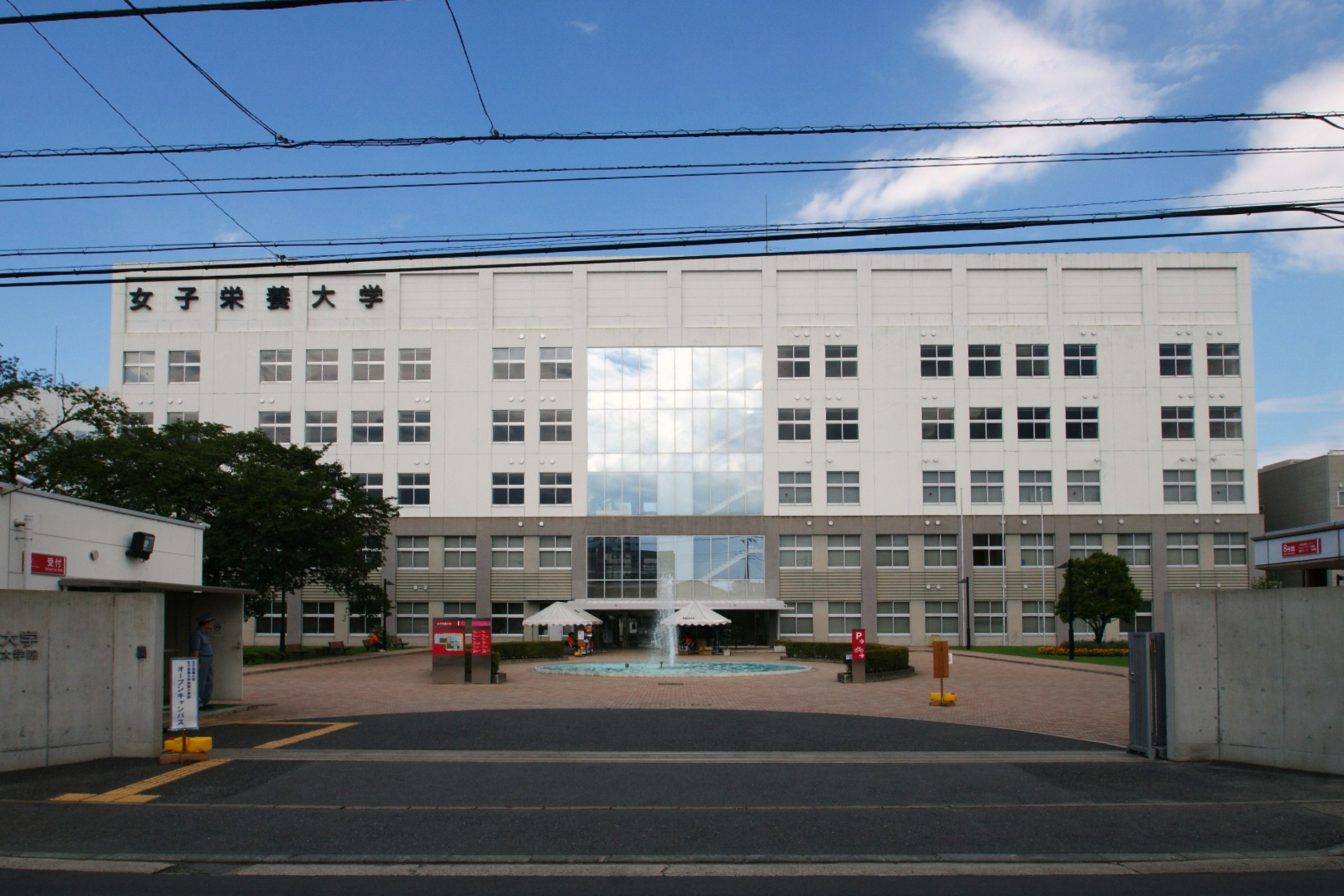
- Sakado Campus, August 2009
- Former names: Kagawa Nutrition Education Foundation
- Type: Private
- Established: 1948
- Location: Sakado, Saitama, Japan
- Campus: Urban
- Website: www.eiyo.ac.jp/english/e_index.html

Kagawa Nutrition University (女子栄養大学, Joshi Eiyō Daigaku) is a private university in Japan.

The university has two campuses, one in Sakado, Saitama and the other in Komagome, Toshima, Tokyo. The Sakado campus contains all undergraduate and postgraduate courses. The Komagome campus houses the Evening Department, junior college, and vocational college.

== History ==
The school was first founded in 1948 as the Kagawa Nutrition Education Foundation (香川栄養学園, Kagawa Eiyō Gakuen). In 1950, the Kagawa Education Foundation established the Kagawa Nutrition Junior College (女子栄養短期大学, Joshi Eiyō Tanki Daigaku).

Kagawa Nutrition University was founded in 1961. In 1965, the university's School of Home Economics was reorganized and renamed the School of Nutrition Sciences.

In 2000, Kagawa Nutrition Junior College was reorganized and renamed the Junior College of Kagawa Nutrition University. In 2001, the Kagawa Nutrition Education Foundation was renamed the Kagawa Education Institute of Nutrition.

== Campuses ==
=== Sakado campus (Kagawa Nutrition University) ===
3-9-21 Chiyoda, Sakado, Saitama 350-0288
Coordinates: 35°57′8.5″N 139°24′40.3″E
(Nearest station: Wakaba Station)

=== Komagome campus (Junior College of Kagawa Nutrition University) ===
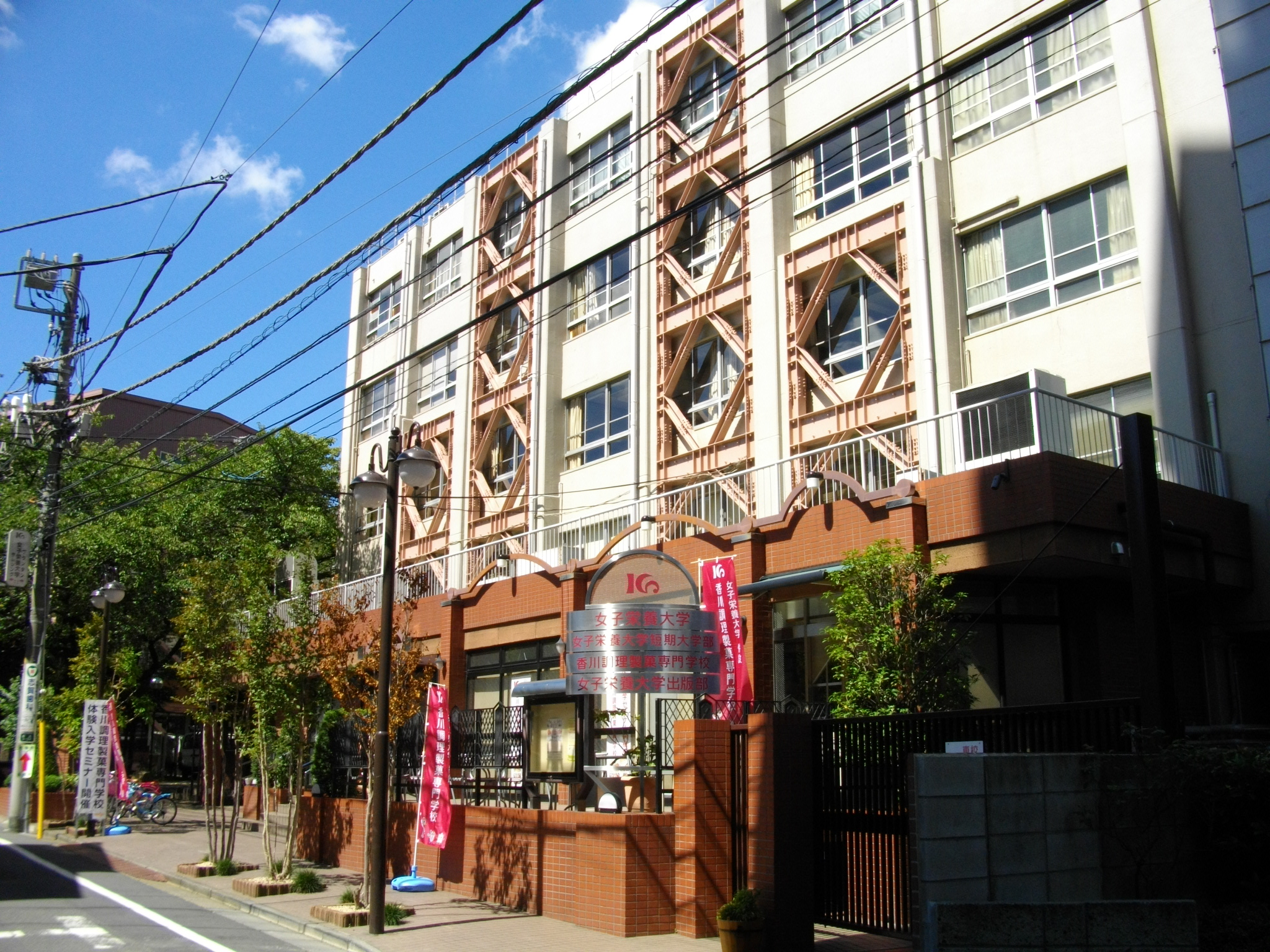
Junior College of Kagawa Nutrition University in Toshima, Tokyo

3-24-3 Komagome, Toshima-ku, Tokyo 170-8481
Coordinates: 35°44′20.1″N 139°44′42.4″E
(Nearest station: Komagome Station)

== Notable alumni ==
- Asako Kishi, culinary critic, journalist, and publisher
