= Wakaba Station =

Railway station in Sakado, Saitama Prefecture, Japan

TJ25 Wakaba Station 若葉駅
- Wakaba Station west side and forecourt in October 2026

General information
- Location: 4-13-1 Sekima, Sakado-shi, Saitama-ken 350-0215; Japan
- Coordinates: 35.9487°N 139.4090°E
- Operator: Tōbu Railway
- Line: Tōbu Tōjō Line
- Distance: 38.9 km from Ikebukuro
- Platforms: 1 island platform
- Tracks: 2
- Connections: Bus stop

Construction
- Structure type: At-grade
- Accessible: Yes

Other information
- Status: Staffed
- Station code: TJ-25
- Website: Official website

History
- Opened: 2 April 1979

Passengers
- FY2019: 38,038 daily

Services
| Preceding station | Tobu Railway | Following station |
|---|---|---|
| Sakado TJ26 towards Ogawamachi | F Liner | Tsurugashima TJ24 towards Motomachi-Chūkagai |
| Sakado TJ26 towards Yorii | Tojo Line Rapid Express Express Semi Express Local | Tsurugashima TJ24 towards Ikebukuro |
Location
- Location within Saitama Prefecture Location within Japan

Wakaba Station (若葉駅, Wakaba-eki) is a passenger railway station located in the city of Sakado, Saitama, Japan, operated by the private railway operator Tōbu Railway.

== Lines ==
Wakaba Station is served by the Tōbu Tōjō Line from Ikebukuro in Tokyo. Located between Tsurugashima and Sakado, it is 38.9 km from the Ikebukuro terminus. Rapid Express, Express, Semi Express, and all-stations Local services stop at this station.

== Station layout ==
The station consists of a single island platform serving two tracks. The station building is located above the platforms.

East side ground level entrance, October 2026

The ticket barriers, October 2026

=== Platforms ===
| 1 | Tōbu Tōjō Line | for Sakado, Shinrinkōen, Ogawamachi, and Yorii |
| 2 | Tōbu Tōjō Line | for Kawagoe, Wakōshi, and Ikebukuro; Tokyo Metro Yurakucho Line for Shin-Kiba; Tokyo Metro Fukutoshin Line for Shibuya; Tōkyū Tōyoko Line for Hiyoshi and Yokohama; Tōkyū Shin-Yokohama Line for Shin-Yokohama via Sōtetsu Shin-Yokohama Line for Shōnandai; Minatomirai Line for Motomachi-Chukagai |

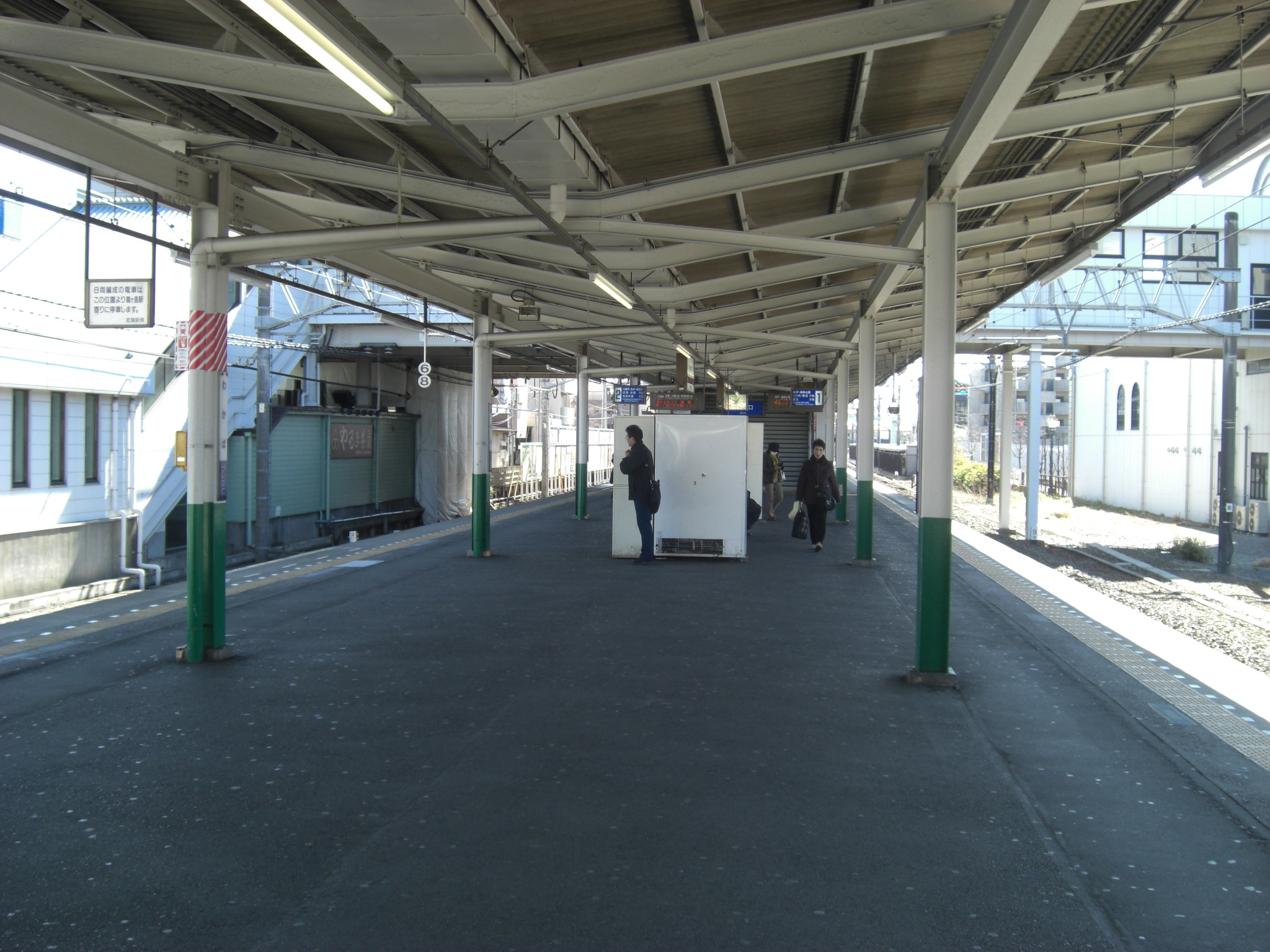
View of the platforms looking toward Ikebukuro from the Sakado end, March 2008

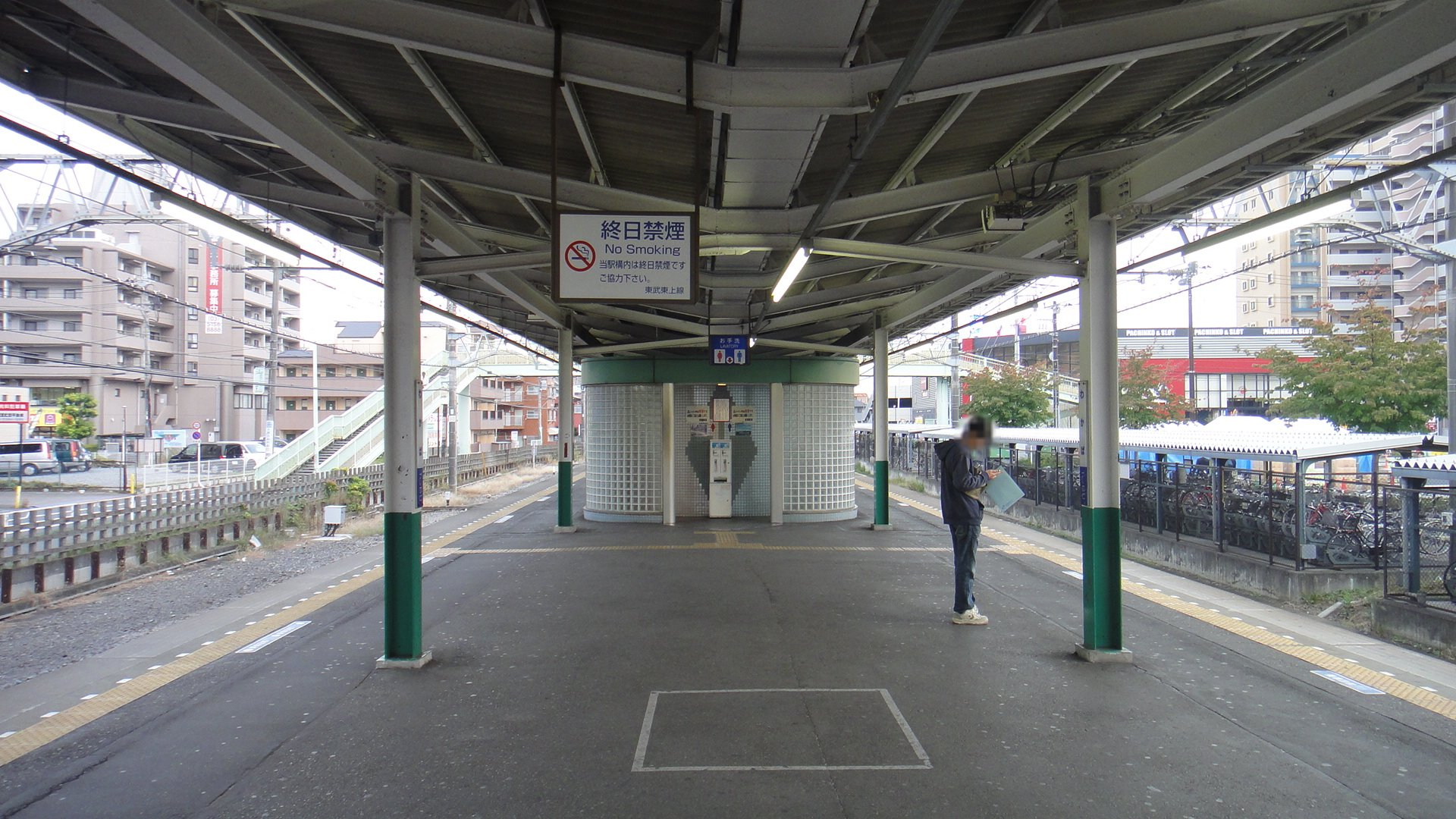
View of the platforms looking toward Ikebukuro, showing the toilet block and former smoking area, November 2011

== History ==
The station opened on 2 April 1979. The name "Wakaba" derived from the nearby Wakabadai housing estate. The station originally had an entrance on the east side only, but was extended in March 2004 with an entrance on the west side leading to a new station forecourt area.

From 17 March 2012, station numbering was introduced on the Tōbu Tōjō Line, with Wakaba Station becoming "TJ-25".

From March 2023, Wakaba Station became a Rapid Express service stop following the abolishment of the Rapid (快速, Kaisoku) services and reorganization of the Tōbu Tōjō Line services. In addition, through service via the Tōkyū Shin-yokohama Line, Sōtetsu Shin-yokohama Line, Sōtetsu Main Line, and Sōtetsu Izumino Line to Shin-Yokohama and Shōnandai commenced.

== Passenger statistics ==
In fiscal 2019, the station was used by an average of 38,038 passengers daily.

== Surrounding area ==
Wakaba Walk shopping centre in front of Wakaba Station, October 2026

Wakaba Station lies on the boundary between the two cities of Sakado and Tsurugashima.

- Kagawa Nutrition University Sakado Campus
- Yamamura International High School
- University of Tsukuba Senior High School at Sakado
- Wakaba Walk Shopping Centre
- Xien Ten Gong, the largest Taoist temple in Japan
- Fujimi Industrial Estate

== Bus services ==
The north side of the station is served by the "Tsuru Wagon" community minibus service operated by the city of Tsurugashima, and by the "Sakacchi Wagon" (Miyoshino Line) community minibus service operated by the city of Sakado.

== See also ==
- List of railway stations in Japan
