= Kasumigaseki Station =

Kasumigaseki Station is the name of two train stations in Japan.

- Kasumigaseki Station (Saitama) in Kawagoe, Saitama Prefecture.
- Kasumigaseki Station (Tokyo) in Tokyo.
