= F Liner =

Subway express service in Tokyo, Japan

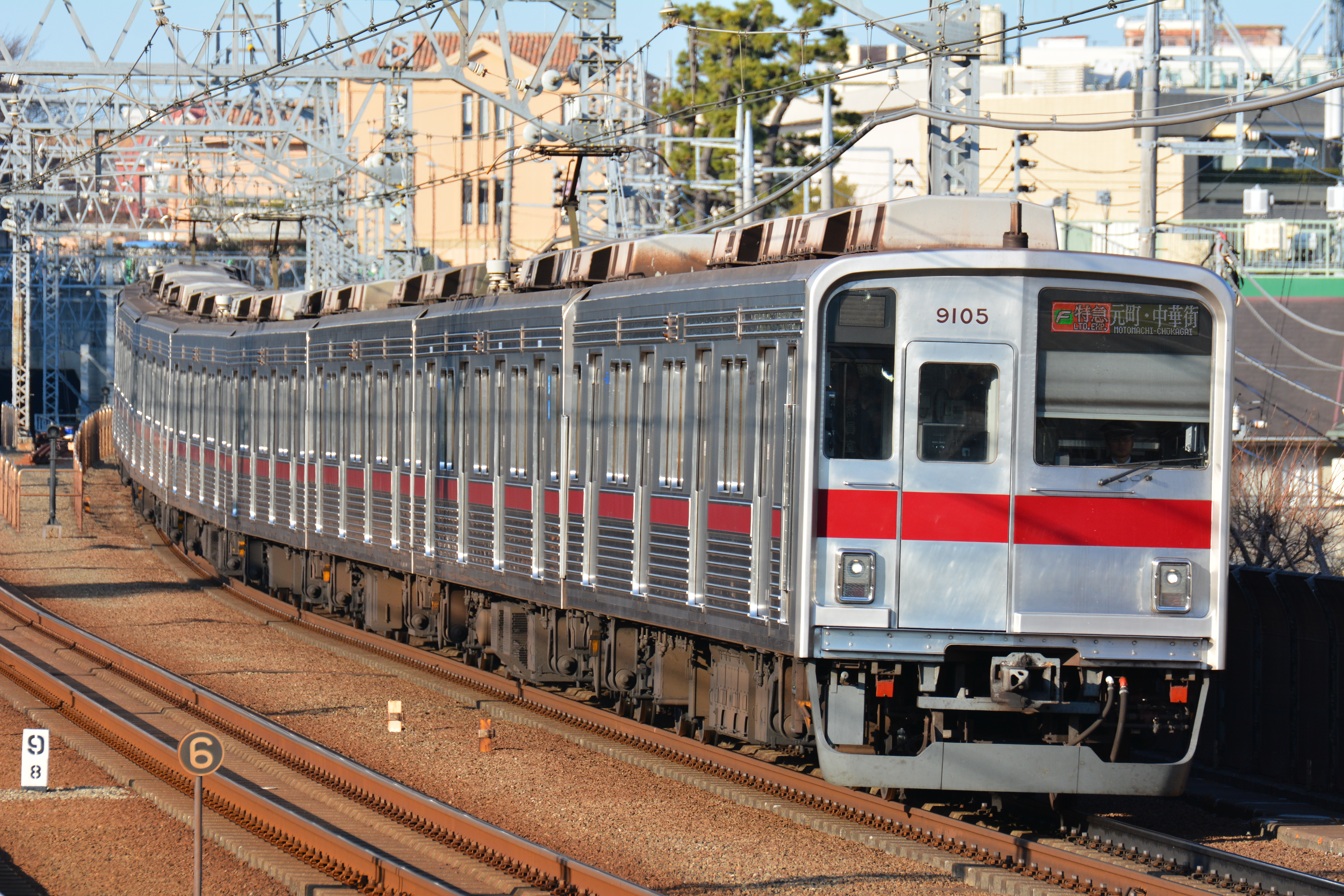
- The F Liner Logo (Top); Tobu 9000 series train on an F Liner service (Bottom)

Overview
- Status: Operational
- Locale: Tokyo, Kanagawa Prefecture, Saitama Prefecture
- First service: 26 March 2016
- Current operators: Tobu Railway; Seibu Railway; Tokyo Metro; Tokyu Corporation; Yokohama Minatomirai Railway

Route
- Termini: Hannō or Ogawamachi; Motomachi-Chūkagai
- Lines used: Ikebukuro Line; Seibu Yūrakuchō Line; Tojo Line; Fukutoshin Line; Tōyoko Line; Minatomirai Line

Technical
- Rolling stock: See § Rolling stock
- Track gauge: 1,067 mm (3 ft 6 in)
- Electrification: 1,500 V DC overhead

F Liner (Fライナー, Efu Rainā) is the name for the fastest through service train among five railway companies: the Tobu Railway, Seibu Railway, Tokyo Metro, Tokyu Corporation and Yokohama Minatomirai Railway.

This name is trademarked by the aforementioned five companies (No. 5885630).

== Service pattern ==
The name "F Liner" is given to trains under the two route systems explained below. The service type of trains may change once across boundary stations for two different lines. Therefore, systematically, the name "F Liner" will be added before the service type; this means all F Liner trains are referred to as "F Liner, (Service type on current line)". For instance: Within the Fukutoshin Line → "F Liner, Express", bound for Motomachi-Chūkagai; Within the Toyoko Line → "F Liner, Limited Express", bound for Shinrin-Kōen.

1. Seibu Line system: Hannō / Kotesashi - Motomachi-Chūkagai
  - Seibu Yurakucho Line and Ikebukuro Line: Rapid Express (快速急行)
  - Tokyo Metro Fukutoshin Line: Express (急行)
  - Tōkyū Tōyoko Line and Minatomirai Line: Limited Express (特急)
2. Tōbu Line system: Ogawamachi / Shinrin-Kōen - Motomachi-Chūkagai
  - Tōbu Tōjō Line: Rapid Express (快速急行)
  - Tokyo Metro Fukutoshin Line: Express (急行)
  - Tōkyū Tōyoko Line and Minatomirai Line: Limited Express (特急)

Within the Fukutoshin Line, the Tōyoko Line and the Minatomirai Line, four F Liner trains operate every hour at 15-minute intervals during daytime: two operate on the Tōbu Line system from/to Shinrin-Kōen, and the other two operate on the Seibu Line system, with one operating from/to Hannō, and the other from/to Kotesashi, each operating at 1-hour intervals. For northbound trains on weekend mornings, only one F Liner train operates every hour which terminates at Hannō.

The longest distance travelled for an F Liner journey is 100.1 kilometres (62.2 mi), from Ogawamachi to Motomachi-Chūkagai.

From 18 March 2023, F Liner services now operate as Rapid Express services on the Tobu Tojo Line instead of Express services, skipping Shiki and Fujimino. Previously, F Liner trains did not operate as the fastest possible through service on the Tojo Line, as faster Rapid Express through services ran alongside the F Liner's Express services.

== Stations served ==
Legend
- ● : Stops
- ∥ : Does not run through here

Company	Route	Service type	Station No.	Station	Japanese	Seibu Line system	Tōbu Line system
Seibu Railway	Seibu Yūrakuchō Line & Ikebukuro Line	Rapid Express	SI26	Hannō	飯能	●	
Seibu Railway	Seibu Yūrakuchō Line & Ikebukuro Line	Rapid Express	SI23	Irumashi	入間市	●	
Seibu Railway	Seibu Yūrakuchō Line & Ikebukuro Line	Rapid Express	SI19	Kotesashi	小手指	●	
Seibu Railway	Seibu Yūrakuchō Line & Ikebukuro Line	Rapid Express	SI17	Tokorozawa	所沢	●	
Seibu Railway	Seibu Yūrakuchō Line & Ikebukuro Line	Rapid Express	SI13	Hibarigaoka	ひばりヶ丘	●	
Seibu Railway	Seibu Yūrakuchō Line & Ikebukuro Line	Rapid Express	SI10	Shakujii-Kōen	石神井公園	●	
Seibu Railway	Seibu Yūrakuchō Line & Ikebukuro Line	Rapid Express	SI06	Nerima	練馬	●	
Tobu Railway	Tōjō Line	Rapid Express	TJ33	Ogawamachi	小川町	∥	●
Tobu Railway	Tōjō Line	Rapid Express	TJ32	Musashi-Ranzan	武蔵嵐山	∥	●
Tobu Railway	Tōjō Line	Rapid Express	TJ31	Tsukinowa	つきのわ	∥	●
Tobu Railway	Tōjō Line	Rapid Express	TJ30	Shinrin-Kōen	森林公園	∥	●
Tobu Railway	Tōjō Line	Rapid Express	TJ29	Higashi-Matsuyama	東松山	∥	●
Tobu Railway	Tōjō Line	Rapid Express	TJ28	Takasaka	高坂	∥	●
Tobu Railway	Tōjō Line	Rapid Express	TJ27	Kita-Sakado	北坂戸	∥	●
Tobu Railway	Tōjō Line	Rapid Express	TJ26	Sakado	坂戸	∥	●
Tobu Railway	Tōjō Line	Rapid Express	TJ25	Wakaba	若葉	∥	●
Tobu Railway	Tōjō Line	Rapid Express	TJ24	Tsurugashima	鶴ヶ島	∥	●
Tobu Railway	Tōjō Line	Rapid Express	TJ23	Kasumigaseki	霞ヶ関	∥	●
Tobu Railway	Tōjō Line	Rapid Express	TJ22	Kawagoeshi	川越市	∥	●
Tobu Railway	Tōjō Line	Rapid Express	TJ21	Kawagoe	川越	∥	●
Tobu Railway	Tōjō Line	Rapid Express	TJ13	Asakadai	朝霞台	∥	●
Tobu Railway	Tōjō Line	Rapid Express	TJ11	Wakōshi	和光市	∥	●
Tokyo Metro	Fukutoshin Line	Express	TJ11	Wakōshi	和光市	∥	●
Tokyo Metro	Fukutoshin Line	Express	SI37	Kotake-Mukaihara	小竹向原	●	●
Tokyo Metro	Fukutoshin Line	Express	F-09	Ikebukuro	池袋	●	●
Tokyo Metro	Fukutoshin Line	Express	F-13	Shinjuku-Sanchōme	新宿三丁目	●	●
Tokyo Metro	Fukutoshin Line	Express	F-15	Meiji-Jingumae 'Harajuku'	明治神宮前〈原宿〉	●	●
Tokyo Metro	Fukutoshin Line	Express	F-16 TY-01	Shibuya	渋谷	●	●
Tokyu Corporation	Tōyoko Line	Limited Express	F-16 TY-01	Shibuya	渋谷	●	●
Tokyu Corporation	Tōyoko Line	Limited Express	TY-03	Naka-Meguro	中目黒	●	●
Tokyu Corporation	Tōyoko Line	Limited Express	TY-07	Jiyūgaoka	自由が丘	●	●
Tokyu Corporation	Tōyoko Line	Limited Express	TY-11	Musashi-Kosugi	武蔵小杉	●	●
Tokyu Corporation	Tōyoko Line	Limited Express	TY-16	Kikuna	菊名	●	●
Tokyu Corporation	Tōyoko Line	Limited Express	TY-21	Yokohama	横浜	●	●
Yokohama Minatomirai Railway	Minatomirai Line	Limited Express	TY-21	Yokohama	横浜	●	●
Yokohama Minatomirai Railway	Minatomirai Line	Limited Express		Minatomirai	みなとみらい	●	●
Yokohama Minatomirai Railway	Minatomirai Line	Limited Express		Motomachi-Chūkagai	元町・中華街	●	●

== Rolling stock ==
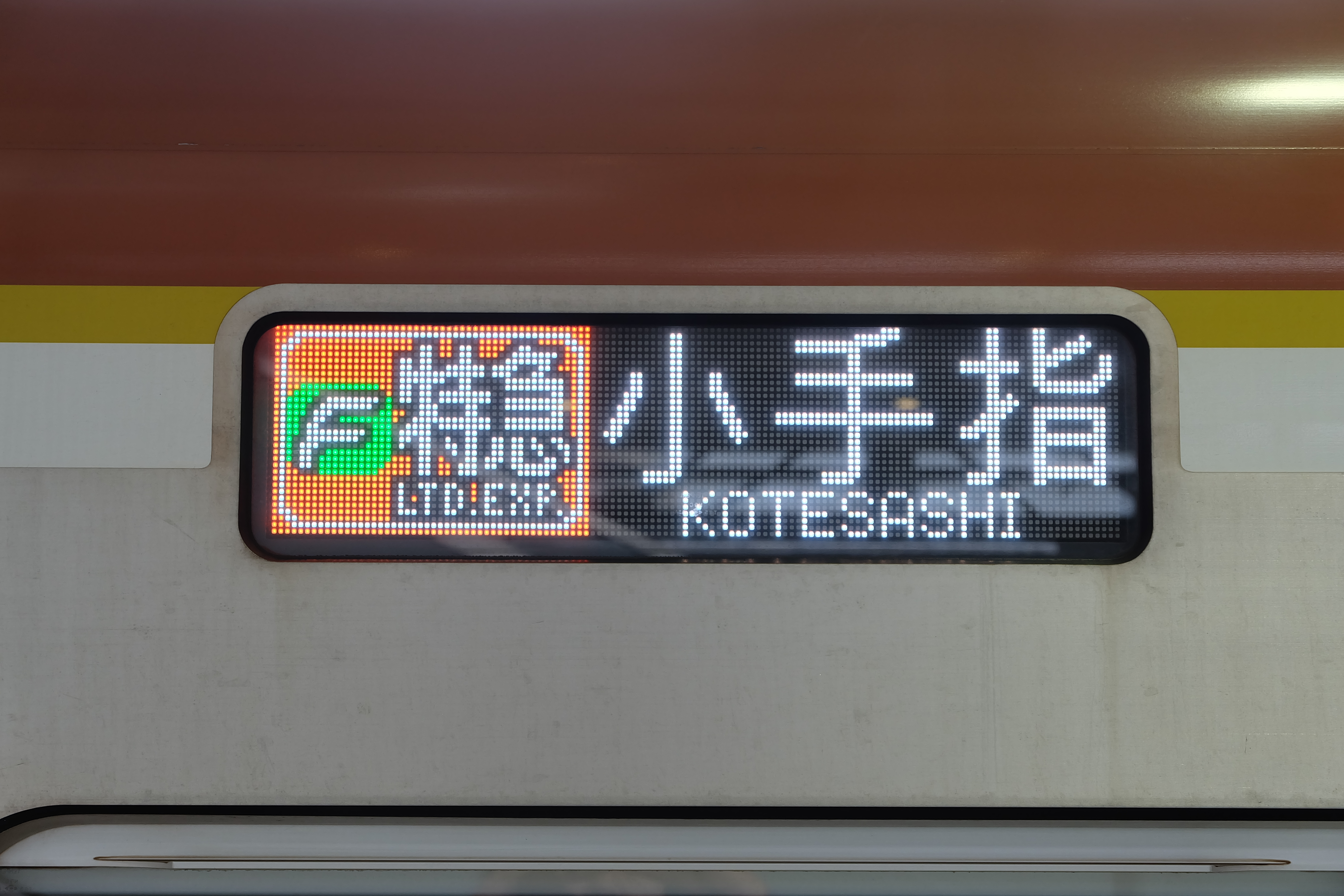
LED displays, from left to right: Tokyo Metro 10000 series, Tokyu 5050-4000 series, Seibu 6000 series

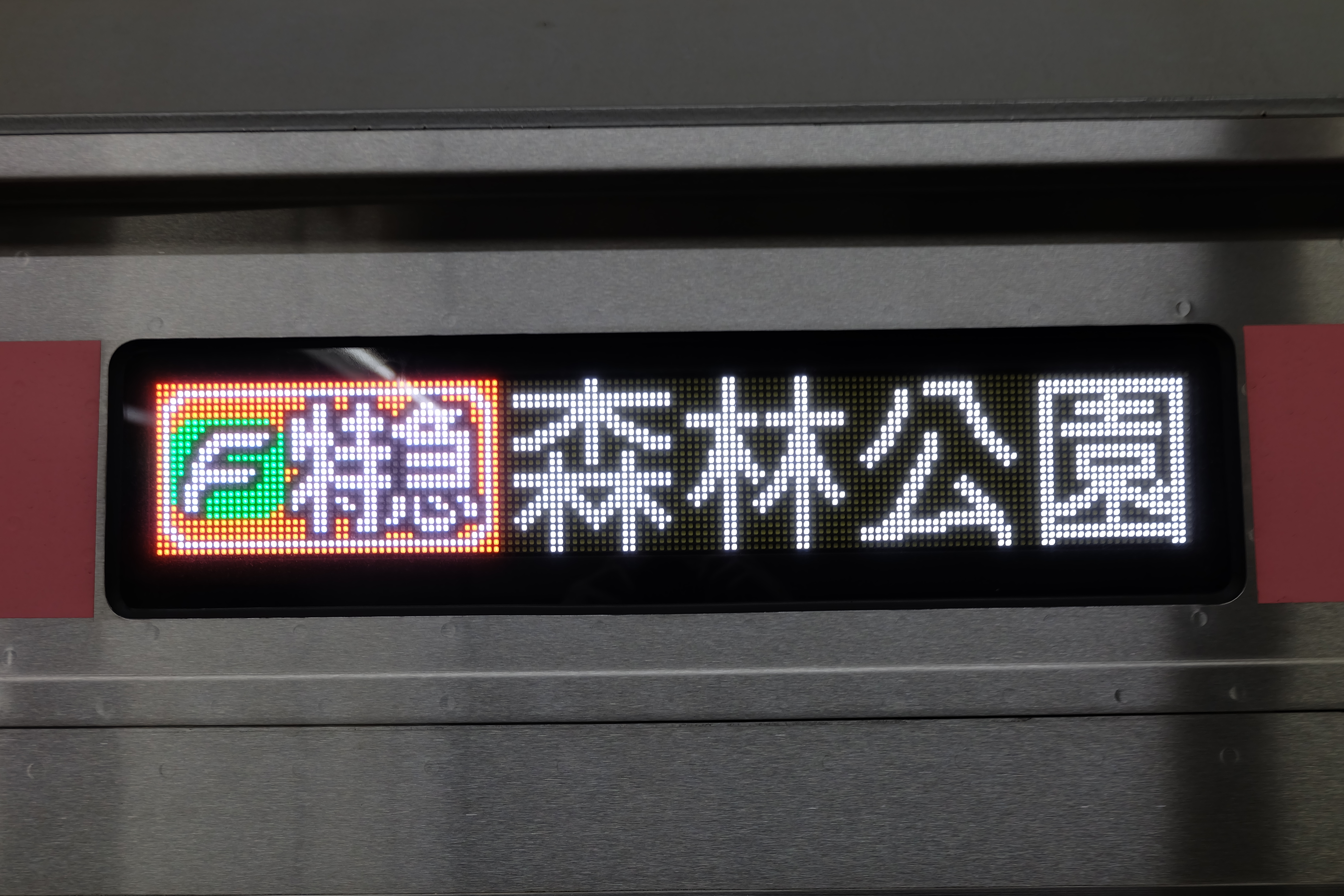
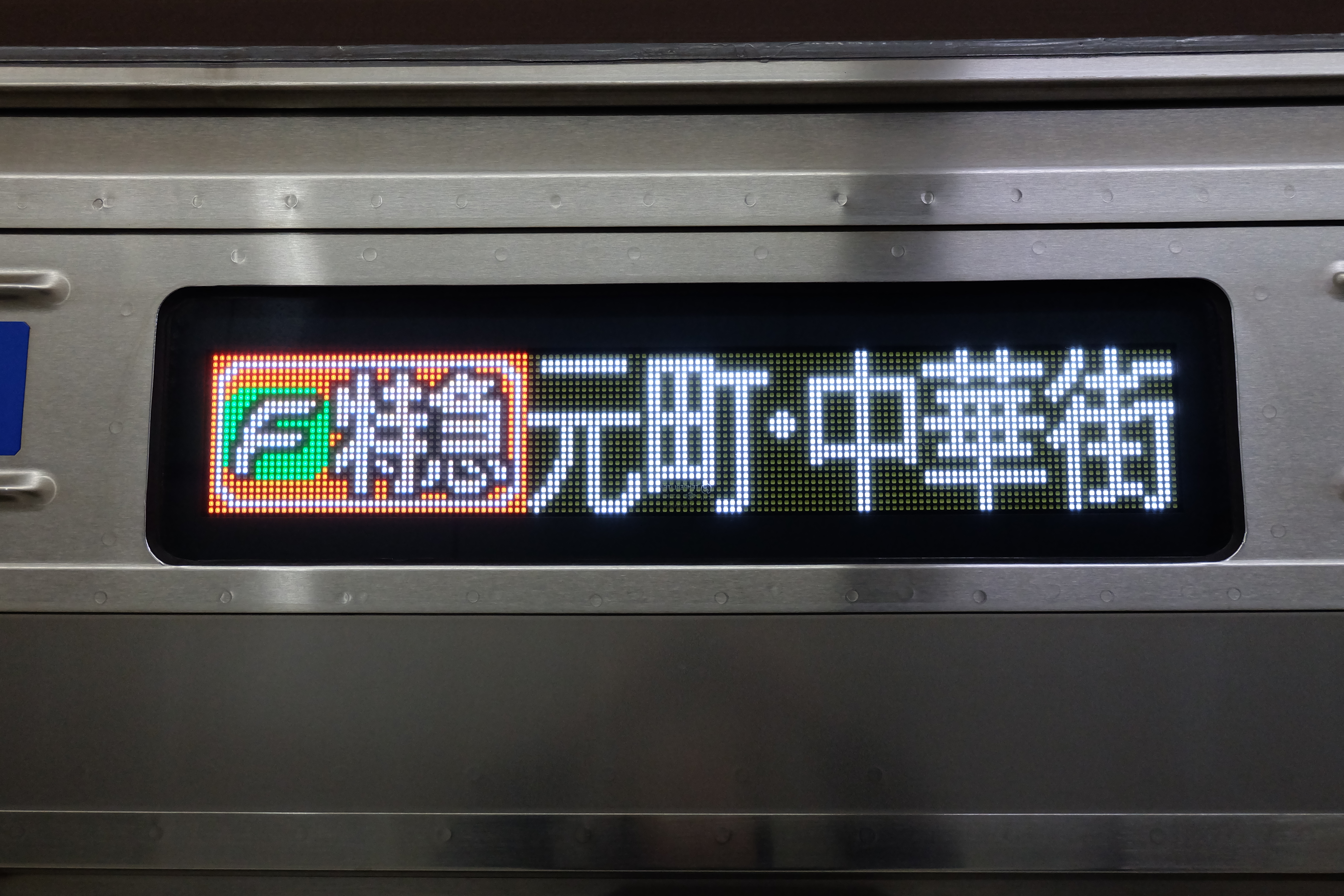

Regularly, all F Liner trains are operated in 10-car sets.

- Tobu 9000 series, Tobu 9050 series EMUs, and Tobu 50070 series EMUs
- Seibu 6000 series EMUs, and Seibu 40050 series EMUs
- Tokyo Metro 17000 series EMUs, and Tokyo Metro 10000 series EMUs
- Tokyu 5050-4000 series EMUs
- Yokohama Minatomirai Railway Y500 series EMUs (Temporary 8-car service)

=== Former ===
- Tokyo Metro 7000 series EMUs (10 car sets only)

== Namesake ==
The F in F Liner stands for 2 English words, and one Japanese word starting with the letter F, which are:

- Fast, which this train is envisioned to become.
- Five, referring to through services between 5 railway companies.
- Fukutoshin (副都心), Japanese for secondary city center.

== See also ==
- S-Train
- Shonan-Shinjuku Line, a major competitor for passenger train services between Ikebukuro / Shinjuku / Shibuya and Yokohama.
- TJ Liner

== Notes & references ==
=== References ===
This article incorporates material from the corresponding article in the Japanese Wikipedia.
