= Seitenkyū =

Taoist temple in Sakado, Saitama, Japan

Coordinates: 35°57′48.46″N 139°25′38.27″E

- 聖天宮
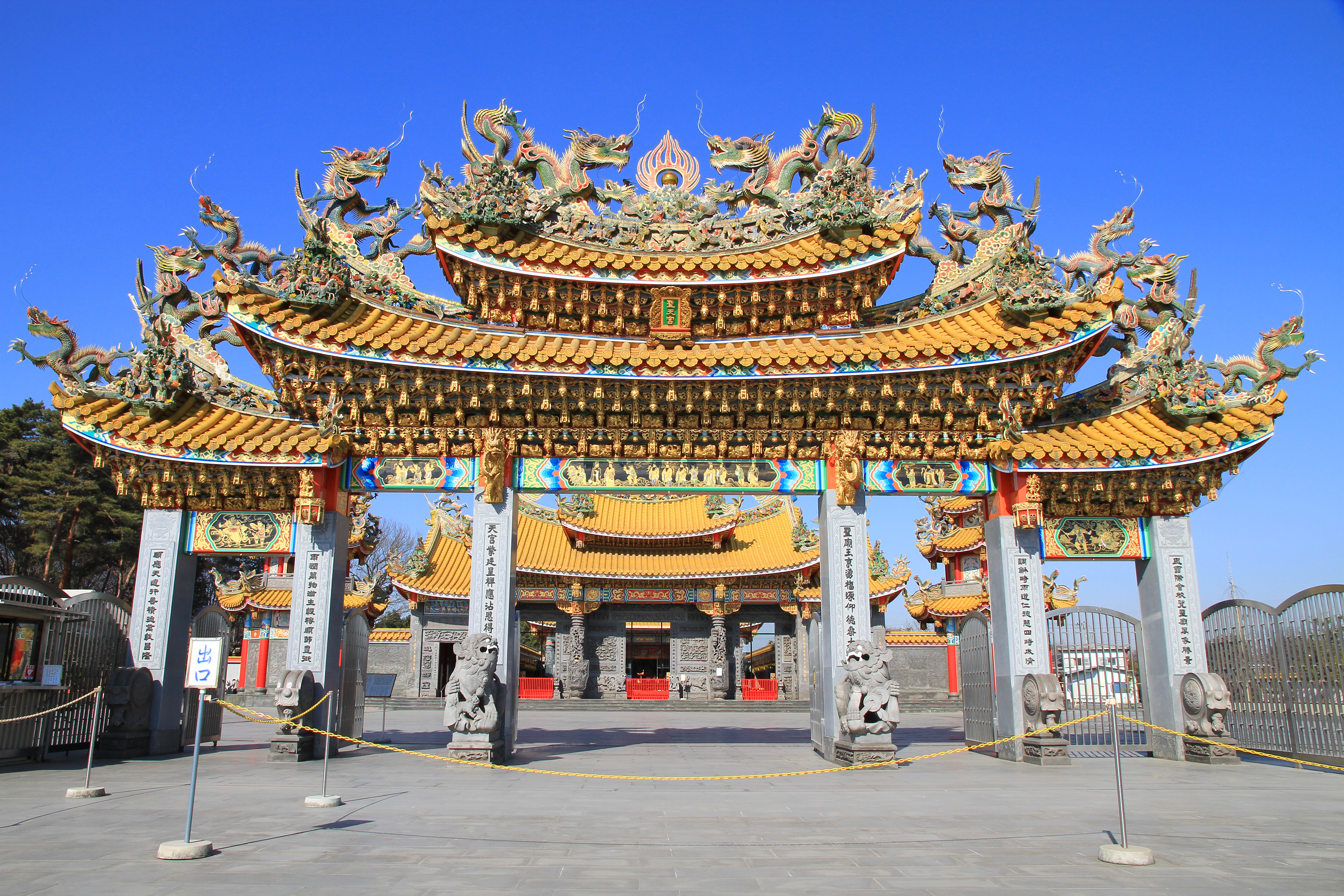
- Main gate to Seitenkyū

Religion
- Affiliation: Taoism
- Deity: Sanqing

Location
- Location: 51–1 Tsukagoshi, Sakado-shi, Saitama-ken
- Country: Japan
- Interactive map of Seitenkyū

Architecture
- Completed: 1995

Website
- www.seitenkyu.com

Seitenkyū (Japanese: 聖天宮/せいてんきゅう, romanized: Seitenkyū; Chinese: 聖天宮, romanized: Shèngtiāngōng) is a Taiwanese style Taoist temple located in Sakado, Saitama, Japan.

Taoist gods including Three Pure Ones are worshipped. Its official name is 五千頭の龍が昇る聖天宮（Hiragana: ごせんとうのりゅうがのぼるせいてんきゅう）, meaning the Holy Celestial Palace of 5000 Soaring Dragons.

Seitenkyū was built with private funds as a memorial to a Taiwanese individual who was cured of a serious illness. The temple was opened in 1995. it is one of the largest Taoist buildings in Japan.

Seitenkyū is open to the public for tours and worship, and most of the visitors are Japanese tourists. The vast grounds of about 26,000 square meters are used for various local events, such as tai chi competitions. The distinctive architecture and spacious grounds are also popular as a filming location for various TV programs and as a photo spot for cosplayers.

== History ==
Seitenkyū was built by Taiwanese trader 康國典(ja:こうこくてん/koh kokuten、zh:kang Kuo-Den) to commemorate his recovery from a serious illness.

The background of the construction of seitenkyu is as follows, according to multiple newspaper interviews with koh's son [3][4].

Born in the 1920s in Banqiao, Taiwan, Koh made his fortune in business with mainland China. In his mid-40s, Koh suffered a serious pancreas-related illness, but after a seven-year battle with the disease, he was completely cured through a wish at Taipei's Si-Nan Temple, which is dedicated to Three Pure Ones, and decided to build a palace to thank God and to allow others to enjoy His blessings as well. In Taiwan, it is customary to build a temple (a small Taoist institution) to show gratitude when a blessing is bestowed.

Koh initially intended to build a palace in Taiwan, but was given a divine oracle that he should build it in Sakado, Japan. The prophecy specifically told him the name of the place to be built, the name "Seitenkyū " the shape of the temple, and the direction of the building. At the time, kou had no connection to Sakado. At the time when the construction began, the area in Sakado was a wooded area and mulberry fields, and there was no Wakaba Station nearby, nor was there a public road in front of the temple, only a farm road. As for the building fund, it is said that after Kou began building, Taiwanese and Japanese sponsored the construction.

Seitenkyū was established as a religious corporation in 1980 [5]. Construction of the temple began in 1981 (Showa 56), and after 15 years of work, the temple was opened in 1995 (Heisei 7).

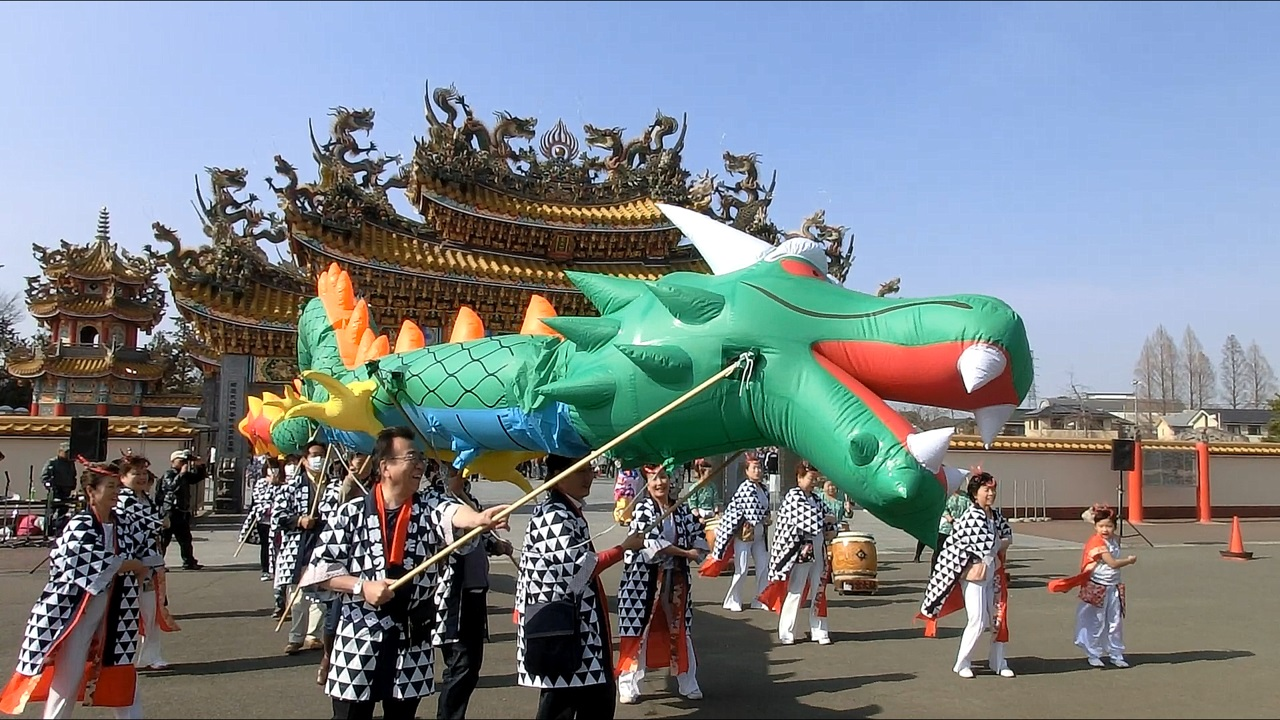
dragon dance

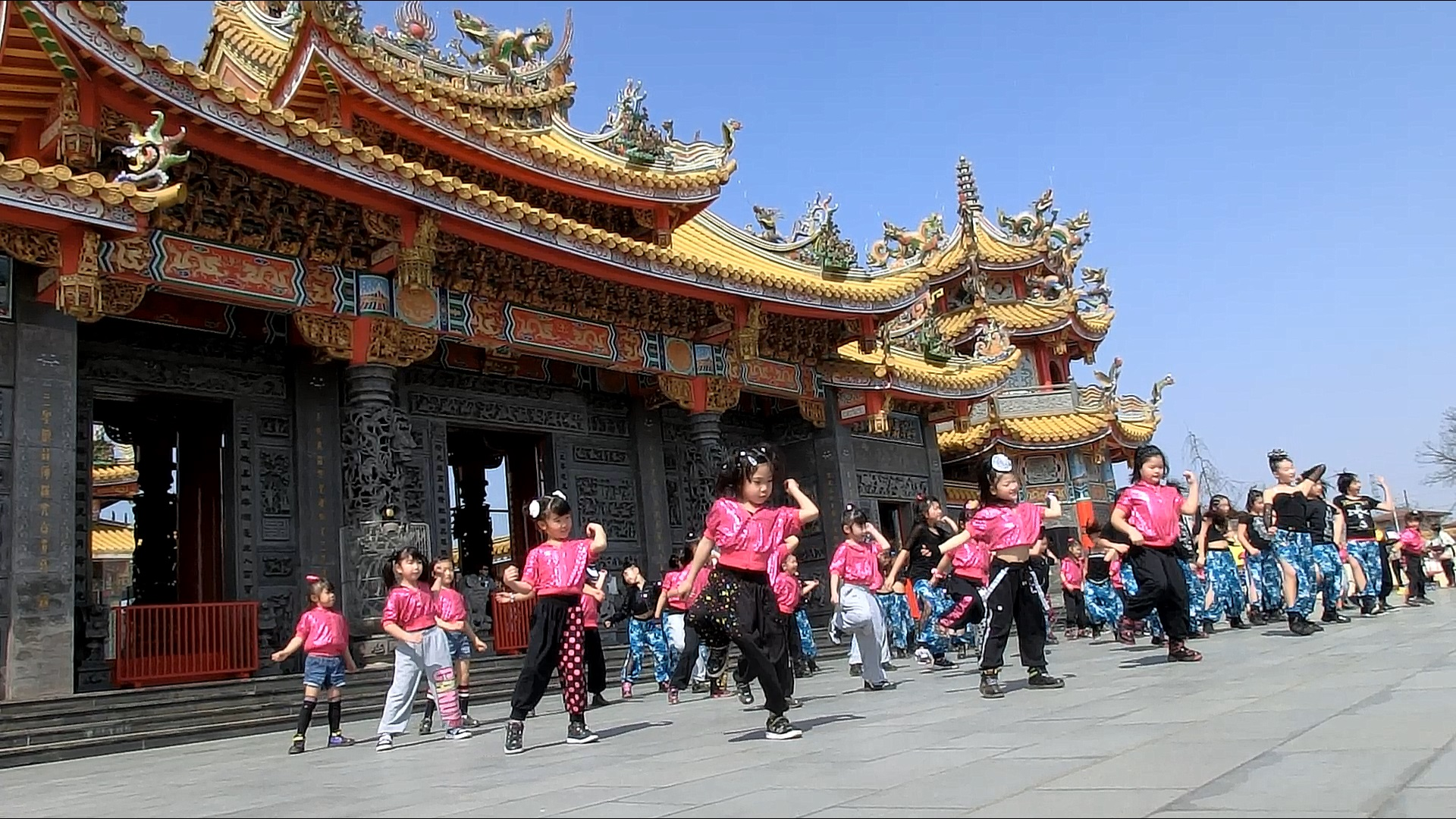
kids dance

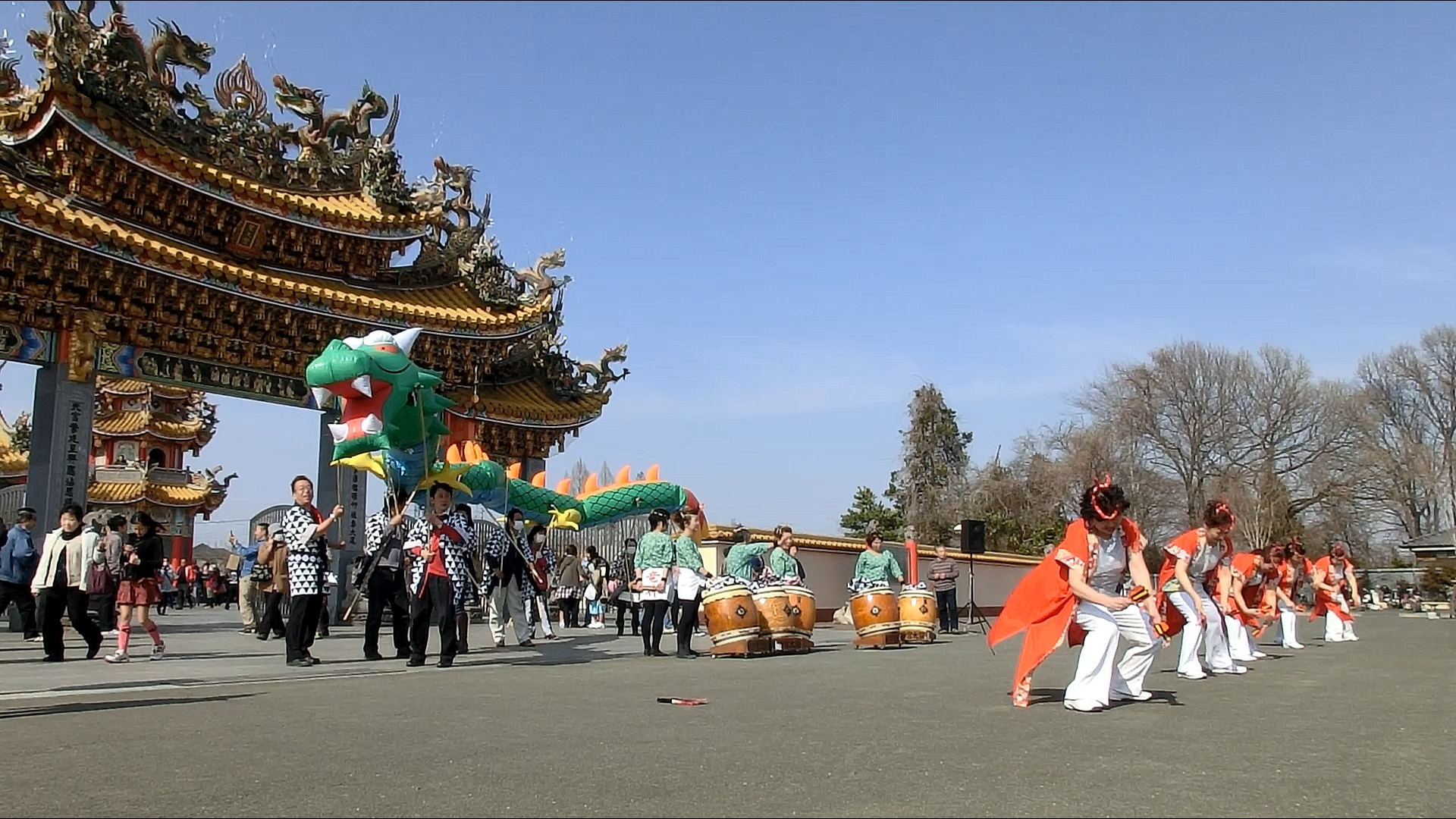
YOSAKOI

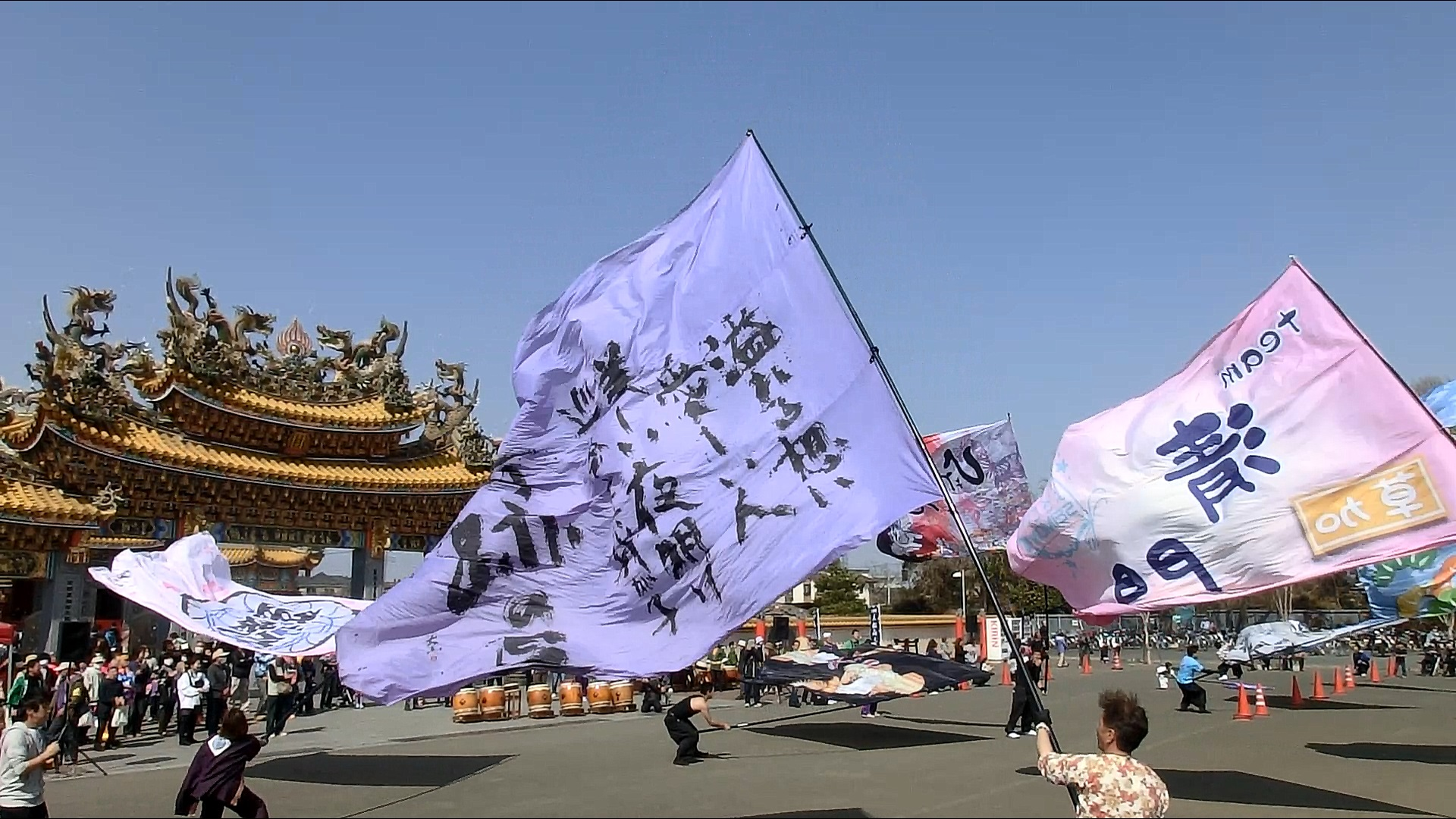
YOSAKOI

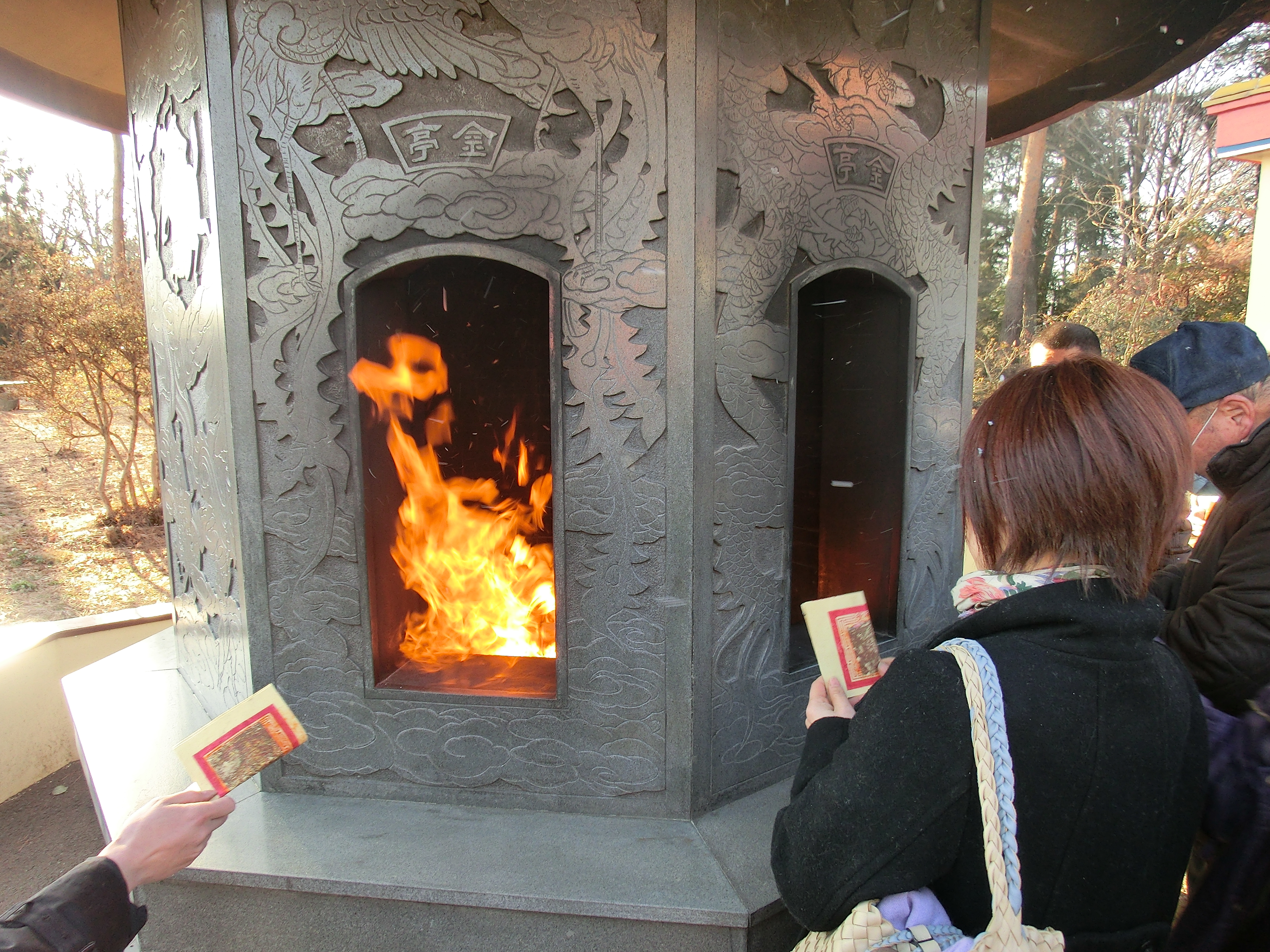

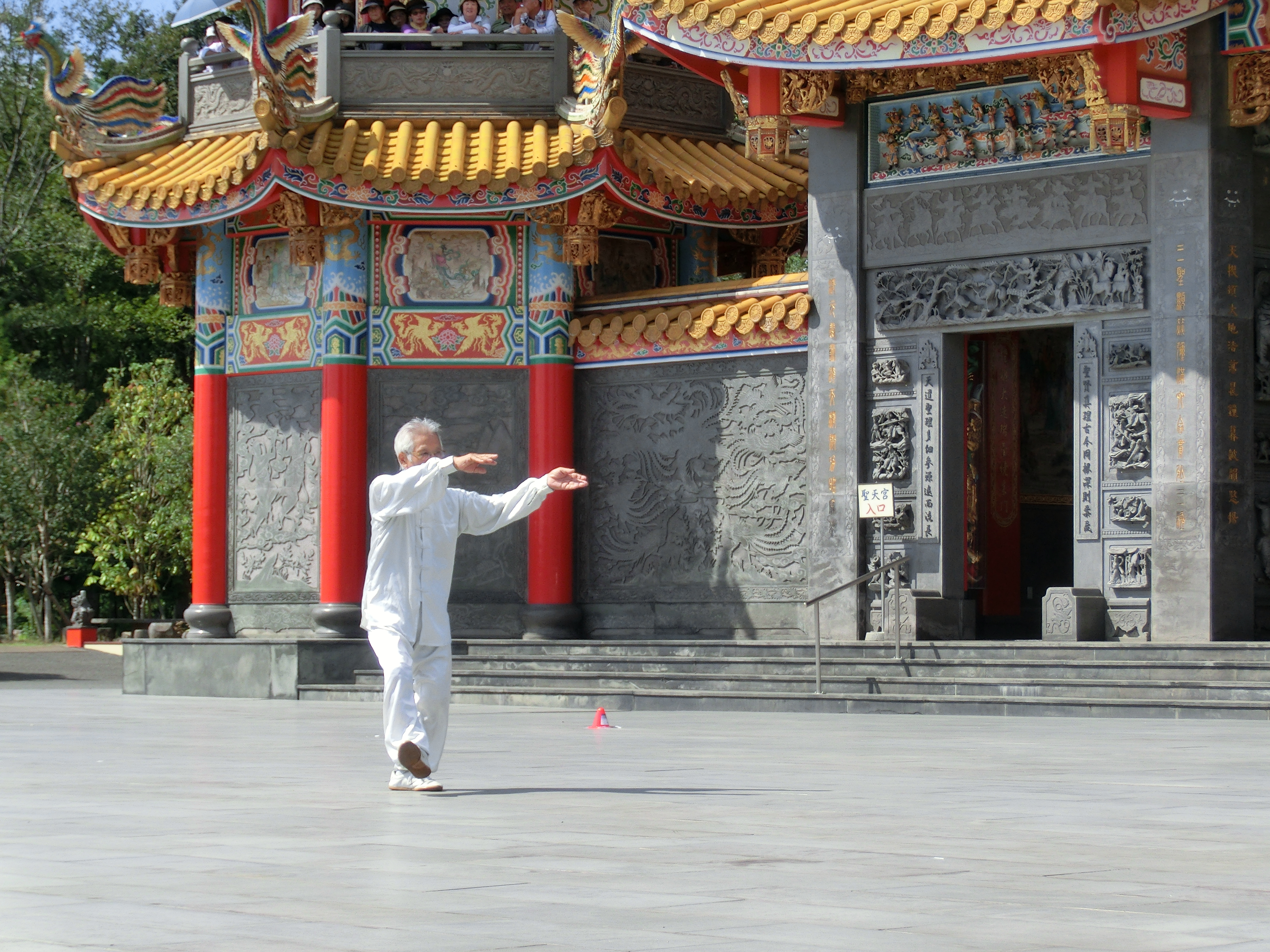

== Features ==
It took 15 years to build this temple. The temple has been built with yellow roof tiles which are exclusively used only for building temples and for housing Emperors. The ceiling in the temple is made of glass of ten thousand pieces. One stone pillar in particular which is 5 m tall is carved from a single piece and the door is 4 m wide.

Three Taoist Deities (Three Pure Ones, Sānqīng Dàozǔ, the Taoist Triad) are worshipped in the temple. The main hall in the temple is built without any nails and has numerous impressive sculptures. Carvings on the stone pillars of five meters height are elaborate and called the Yin "Sōryū pillars". A drum tower to the left of the temple was added later, which offers views of the surroundings.

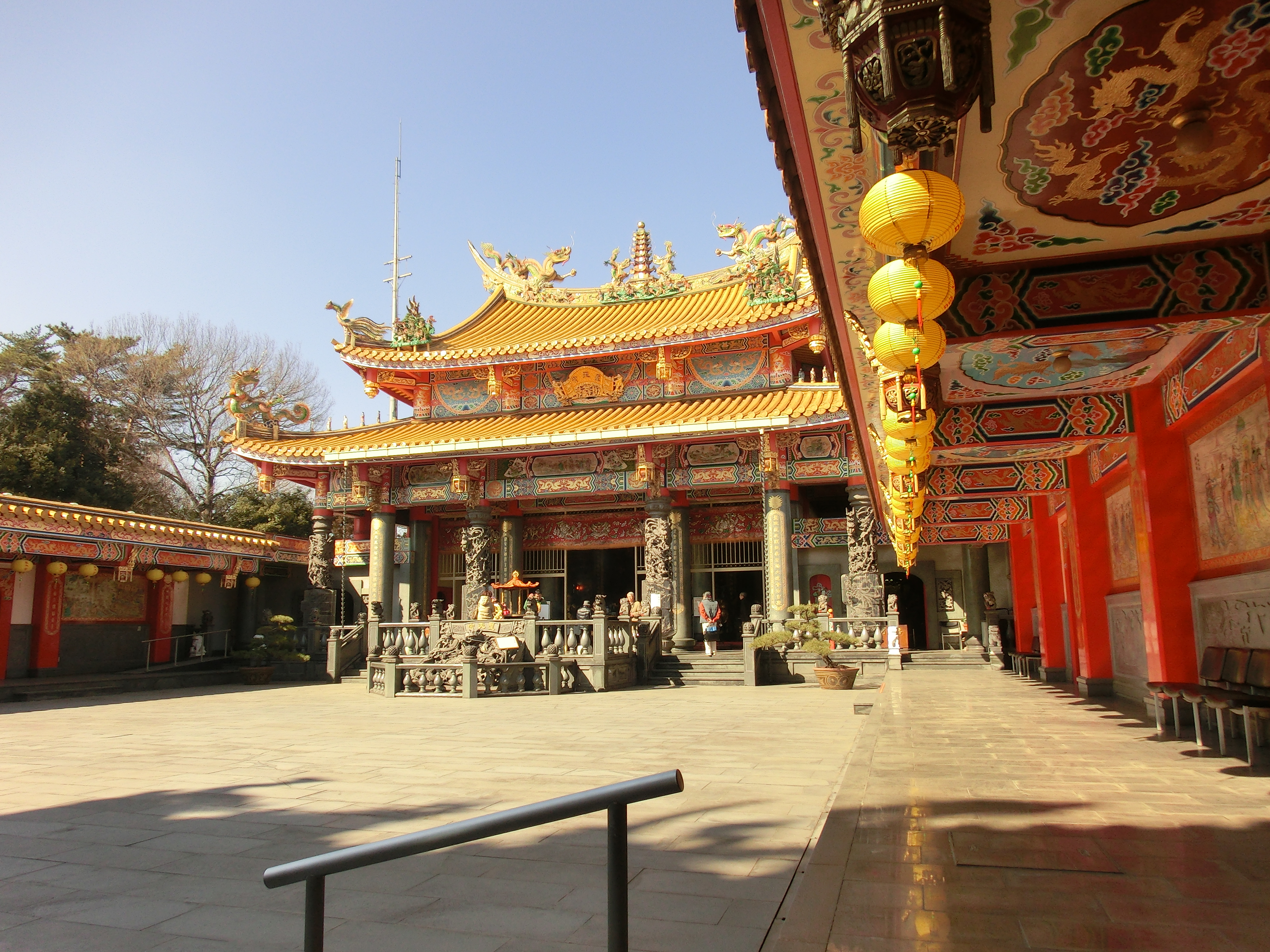

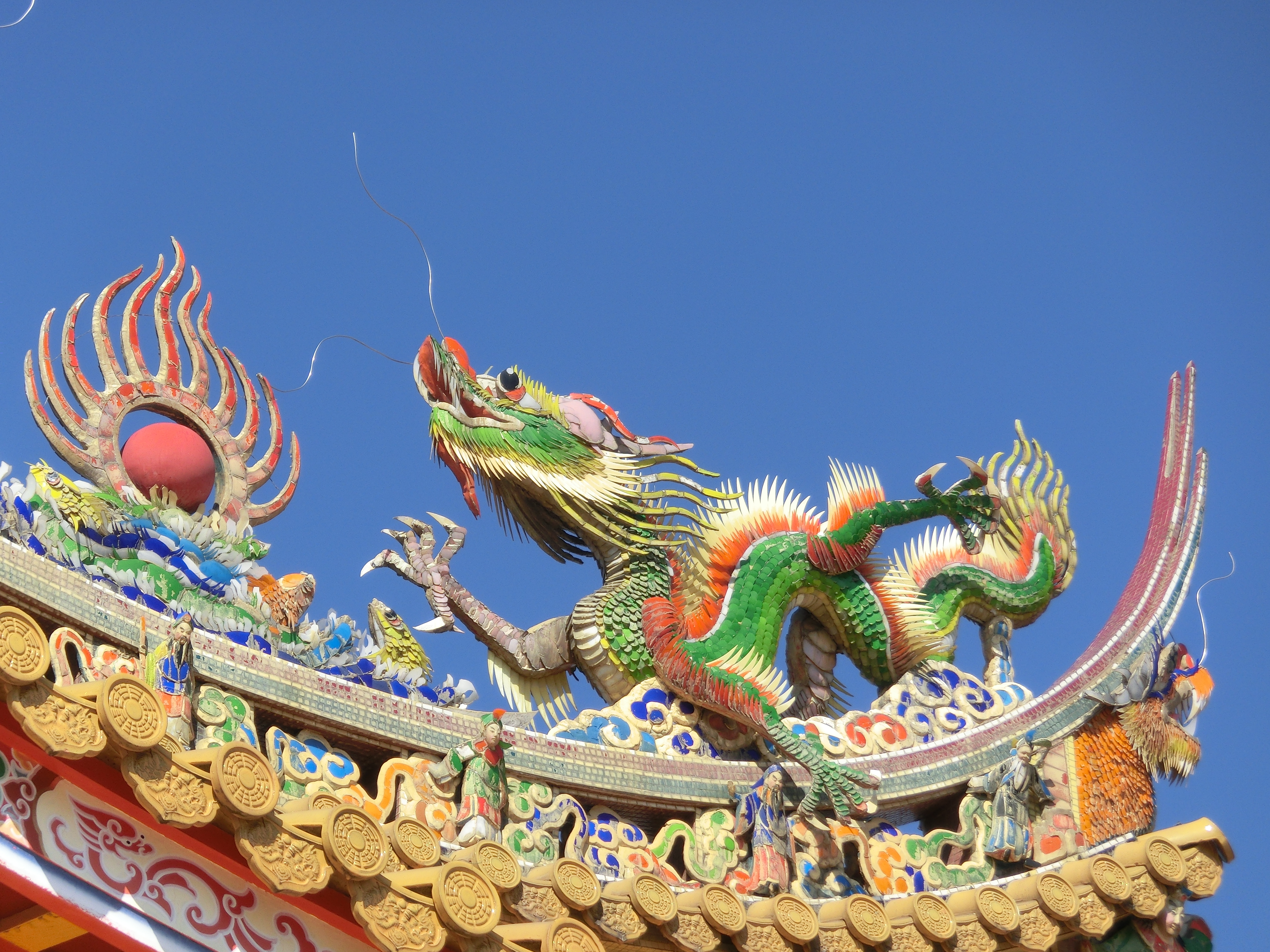

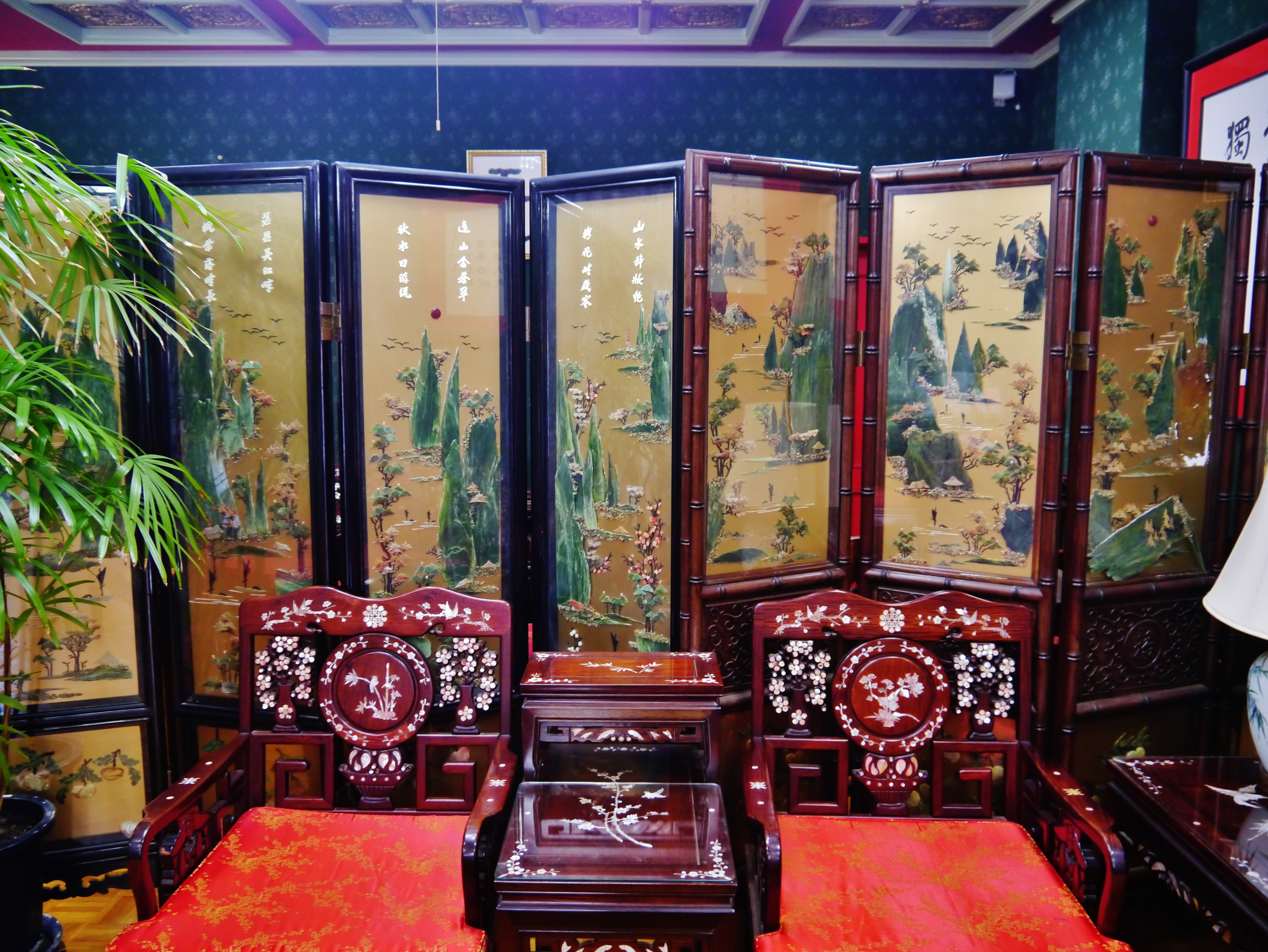

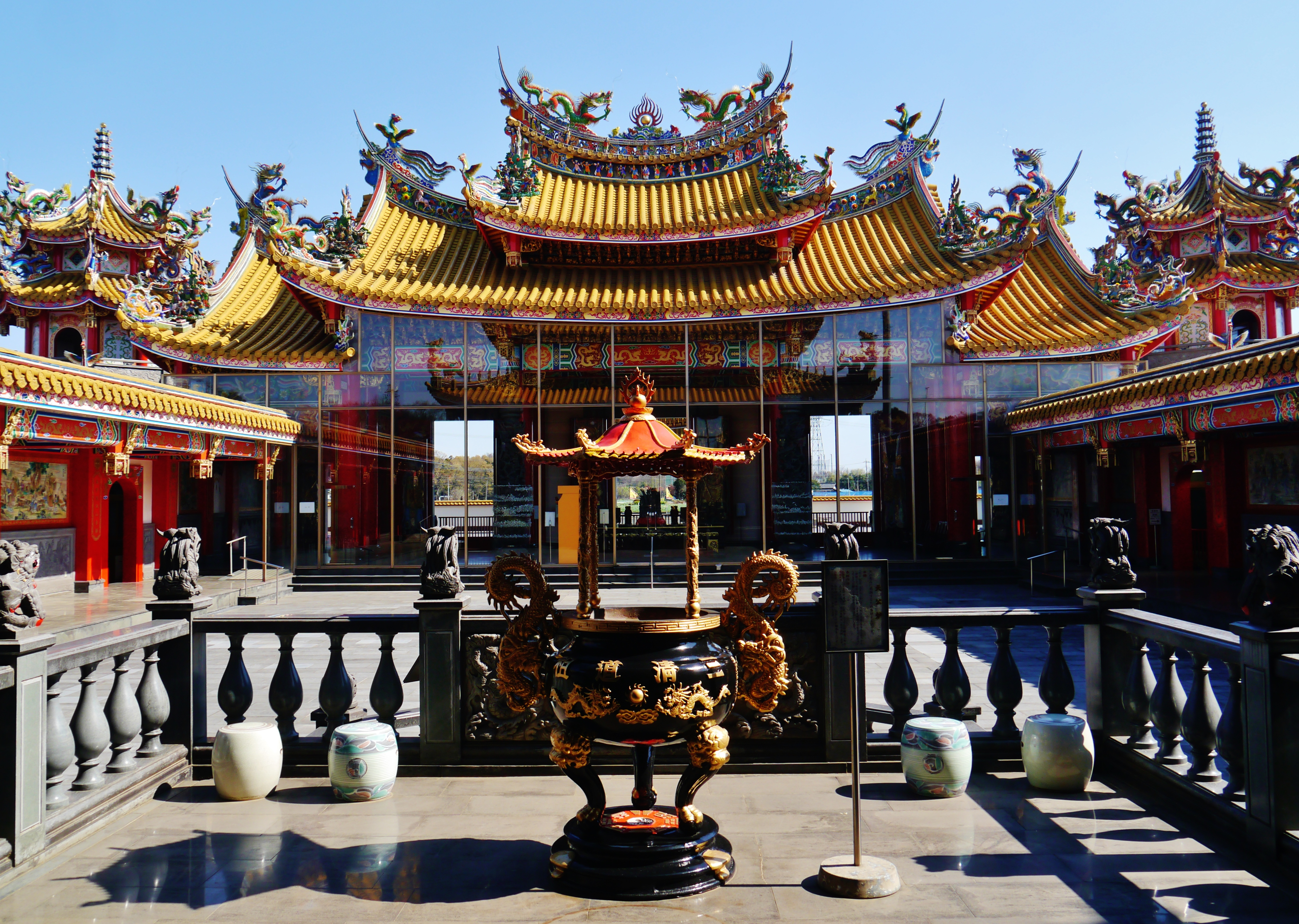

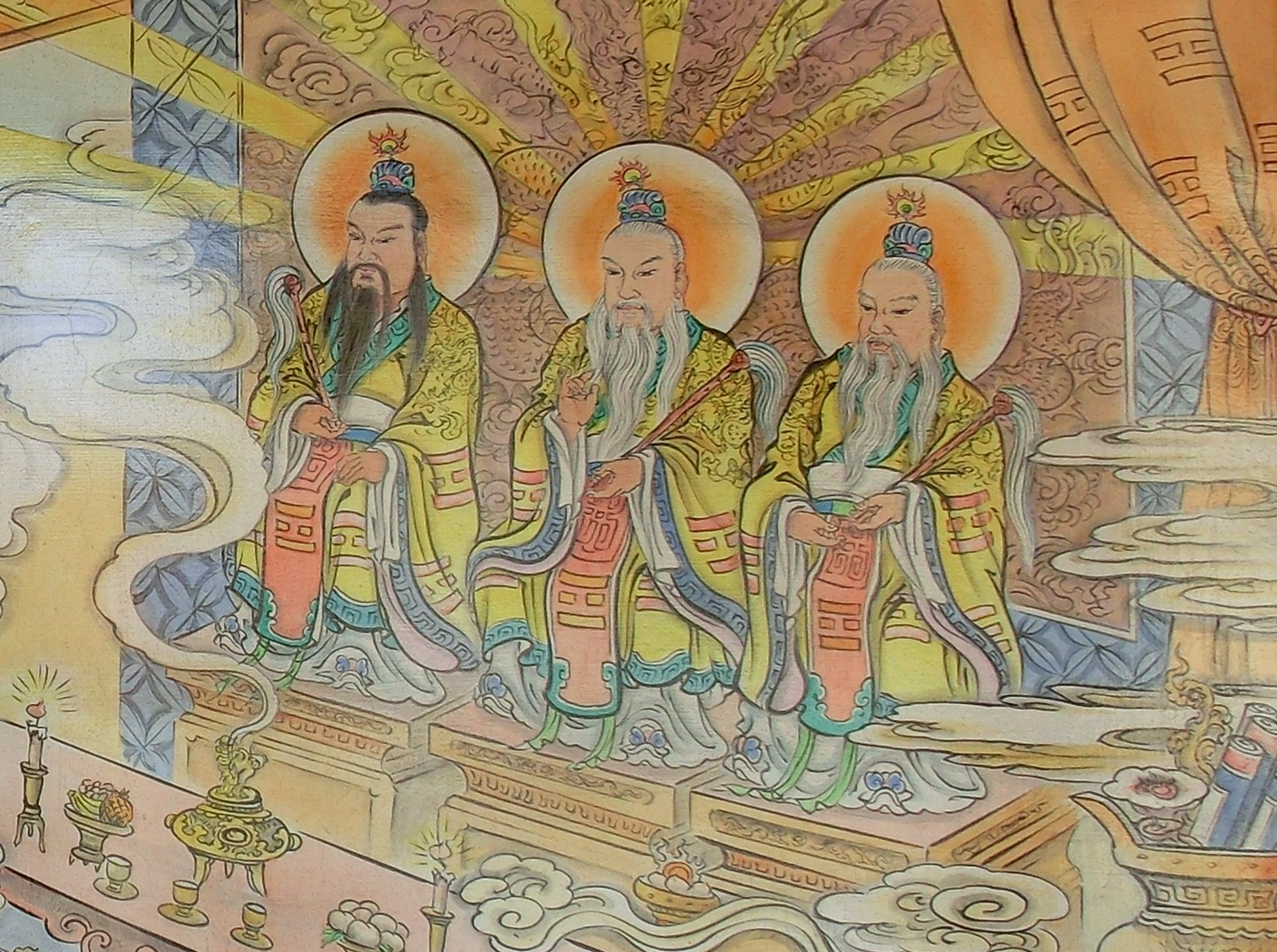

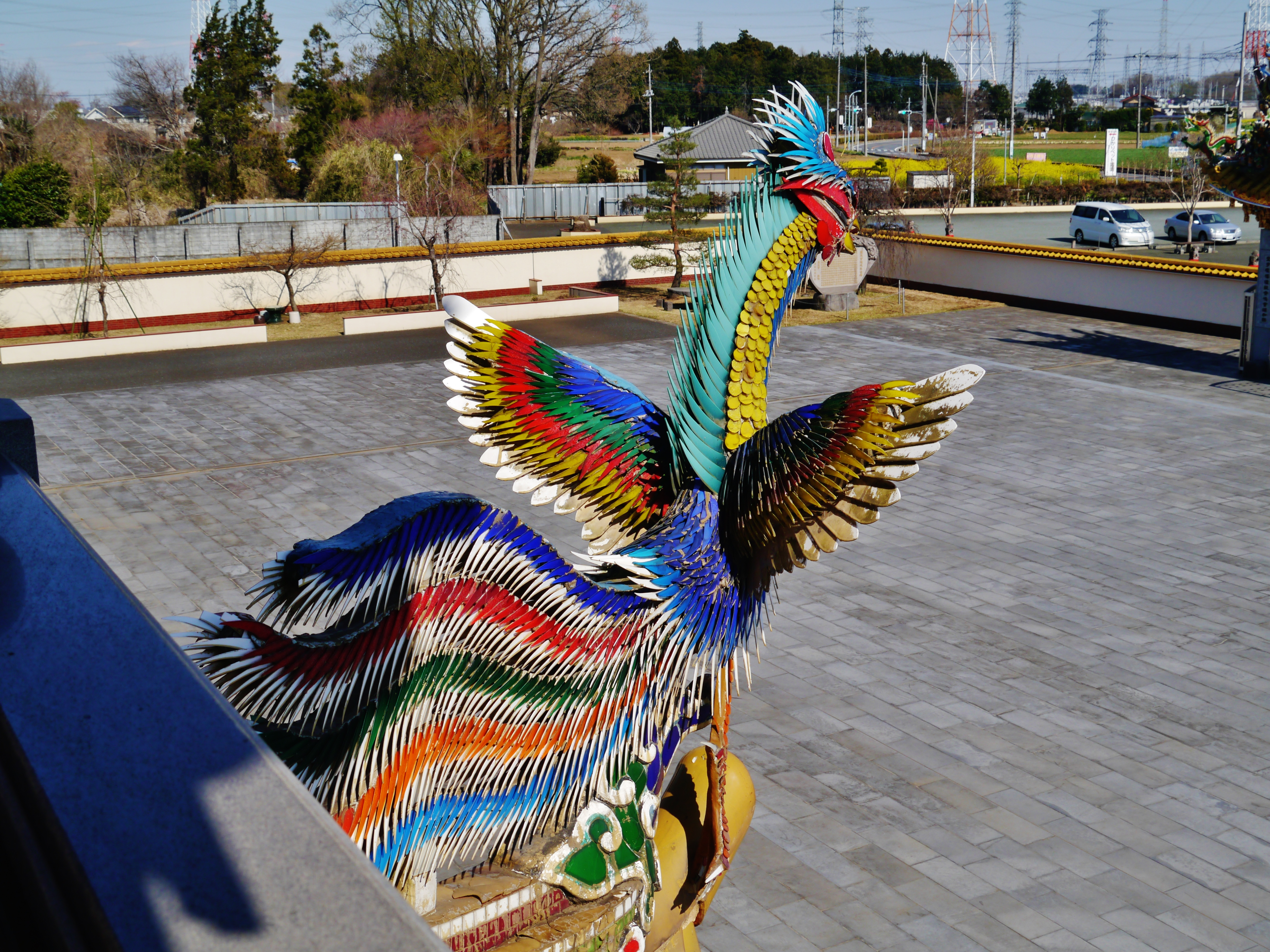

== Worship ==
Prayers are offered daily at the temple with incense burning. The shape and colour of incense smoke are closely observed as it portends significant omens; formations of "Dragon" "Women", "Phoenix" are said to augur well for the devotee offering prayers. Devotees also offer prayers with talismans in different temples of the temple complex, depending on their year of birth, of specific colour seeking fulfillment of their desires.

== Location Filming ==
Because of its unique scenery, Seitengu is often used as a location for filming TV dramas, music videos, and cosplayers. Seitengu temple states that "permission is required for any filming or coverage that exceeds the scope of personal viewing. The following is a partial list of films taken at Seitenkyū.

=== Cosplay ===
Seitenkyū is also a popular place for cosplayers to take pictures. According to a report by the Tokyo Shimbun, cosplayers began to visit around 2007, and in 2012, a total of about 500 people visited the temple for the purpose of cosplay . In response to the recent increase in the number of cosplayers, the Seitenkyū side has also responded with rules, and Master Koh who built the temple, said that he willingly accepted cosplay photography before his death, saying that he wanted many Japanese to experience Taiwanese culture. Seitenkyū explains that it accepts cosplay photography on the grounds that "Taoist teachings do not reject those who come" as long as they follow the rules.

Acceptance of cosplay photography is limited to two groups per day, for a total of 10 people, and advance reservations are required. In addition to general precautions such as the prohibition of lying down to take pictures, there are unique rules for taking pictures on the grounds, such as the prohibition of revealing clothing and undead-like movements and clothing, such as Jiangshi, because it is a religious facility.

In Taiwan, the fact that a Taiwanese religious facility in Japan has become a cosplay attraction is a rarity, and was reported in major newspapers such as the China Times and the otaku-oriented online news site gamme news.
