= Tsurugashima Station =

Railway station in Tsurugashima, Saitama Prefecture, Japan

TJ24 Tsurugashima Station 鶴ヶ島駅
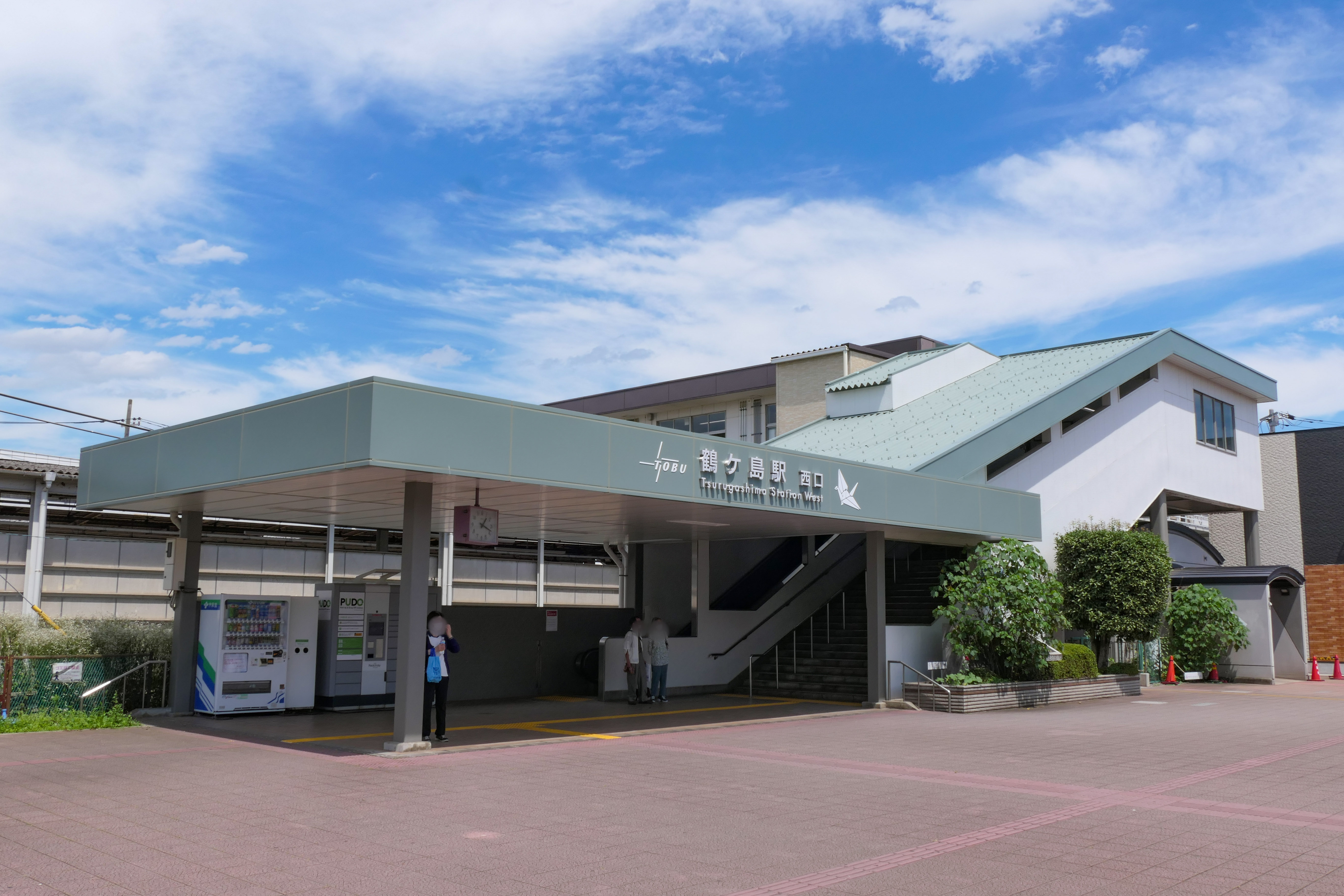
- Tsurugashima Station west entrance in July 2021

General information
- Location: 18-5 Kami-hiroya, Tsurugashima-shi, Saitama-ken 350-2203; Japan
- Coordinates: 35.9367°N 139.4241°E
- Operator: Tōbu Railway
- Line: Tōbu Tōjō Line
- Distance: 37.0 km from Ikebukuro
- Platforms: 2 side platforms
- Tracks: 2
- Connections: Bus stop

Other information
- Station code: TJ-24
- Website: Official website

History
- Opened: 10 April 1932

Passengers
- FY2019: 33,039 daily

Services
Preceding station	Tobu Railway	Following station
Wakaba TJ25 towards Ogawamachi	F Liner	Kasumigaseki TJ23 towards Motomachi-Chūkagai
Wakaba TJ25 towards Yorii	Tojo Line Rapid Express Express Semi Express Local	Kasumigaseki TJ23 towards Ikebukuro
Location
- Location within Saitama Prefecture Location within Japan

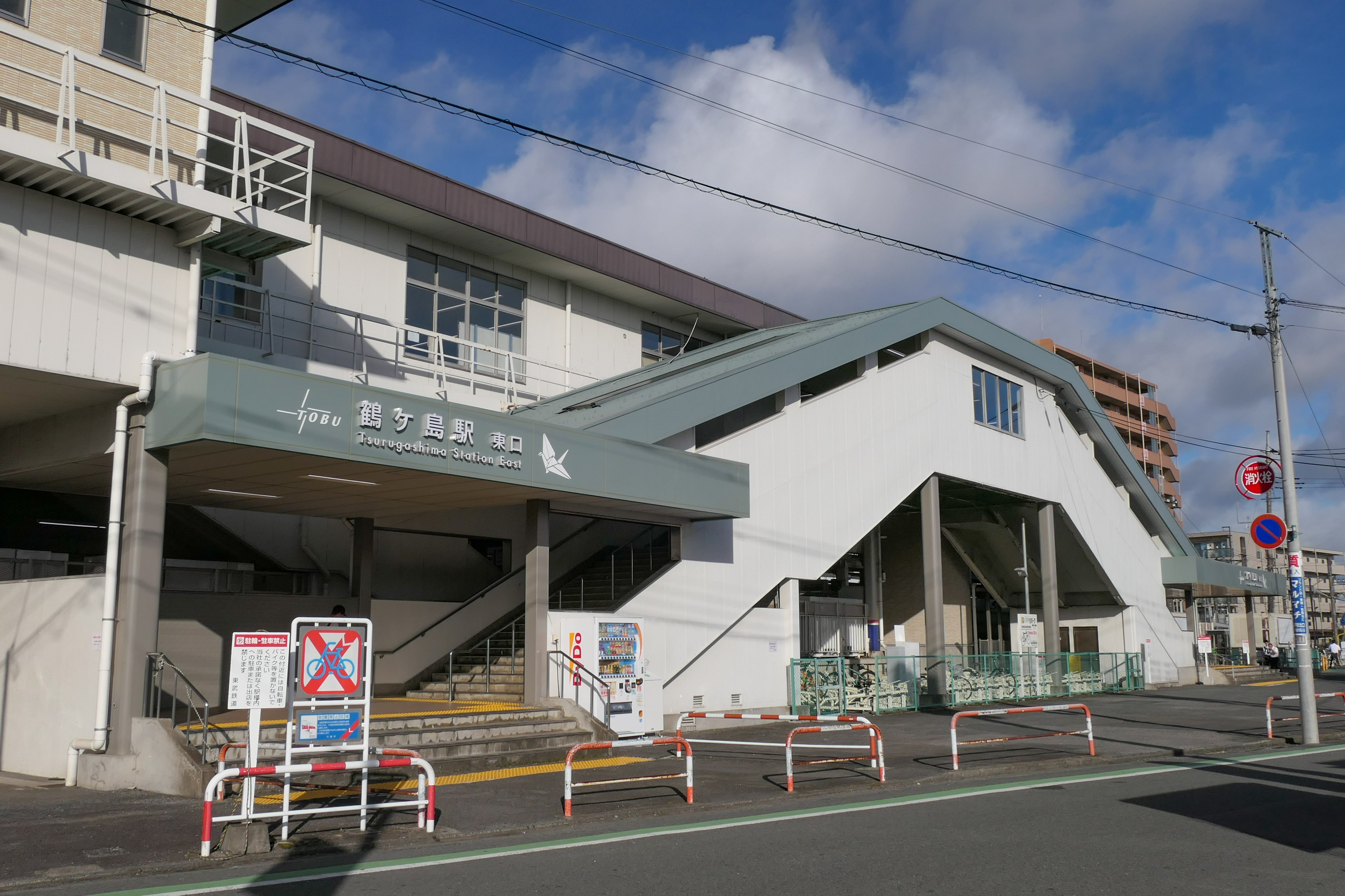
Tsurugashima Station east entrance in August 2021

Tsurugashima Station (鶴ヶ島駅, Tsurugashima-eki) is a passenger railway station located in the city of Tsurugashima, Saitama, Japan, operated by the private railway operator Tōbu Railway.

== Lines ==
Tsurugashima Station is served by the Tōbu Tōjō Line from Ikebukuro in Tokyo. Located between Kasumigaseki and Wakaba, it is 37.0 km from the Ikebukuro terminus. Rapid Express, Express, Semi Express, and Local services stop at this station.

== Station layout ==
The station consists of two side platforms serving two tracks, with an elevated station building above the platforms.

=== Platforms ===
1	Tōbu Tōjō Line	for Sakado, Shinrin-kōen, Ogawamachi, and Yorii
2	Tōbu Tōjō Line	for Kawagoe, Wakōshi, and Ikebukuro; Tokyo Metro Yurakucho Line for Shin-Kiba; Tokyo Metro Fukutoshin Line for Shibuya; Tōkyū Tōyoko Line for Hiyoshi and Yokohama; Tōkyū Shin-Yokohama Line for Shin-Yokohama via Sōtetsu Shin-Yokohama Line for Shōnandai; Minatomirai Line for Motomachi-Chūkagai

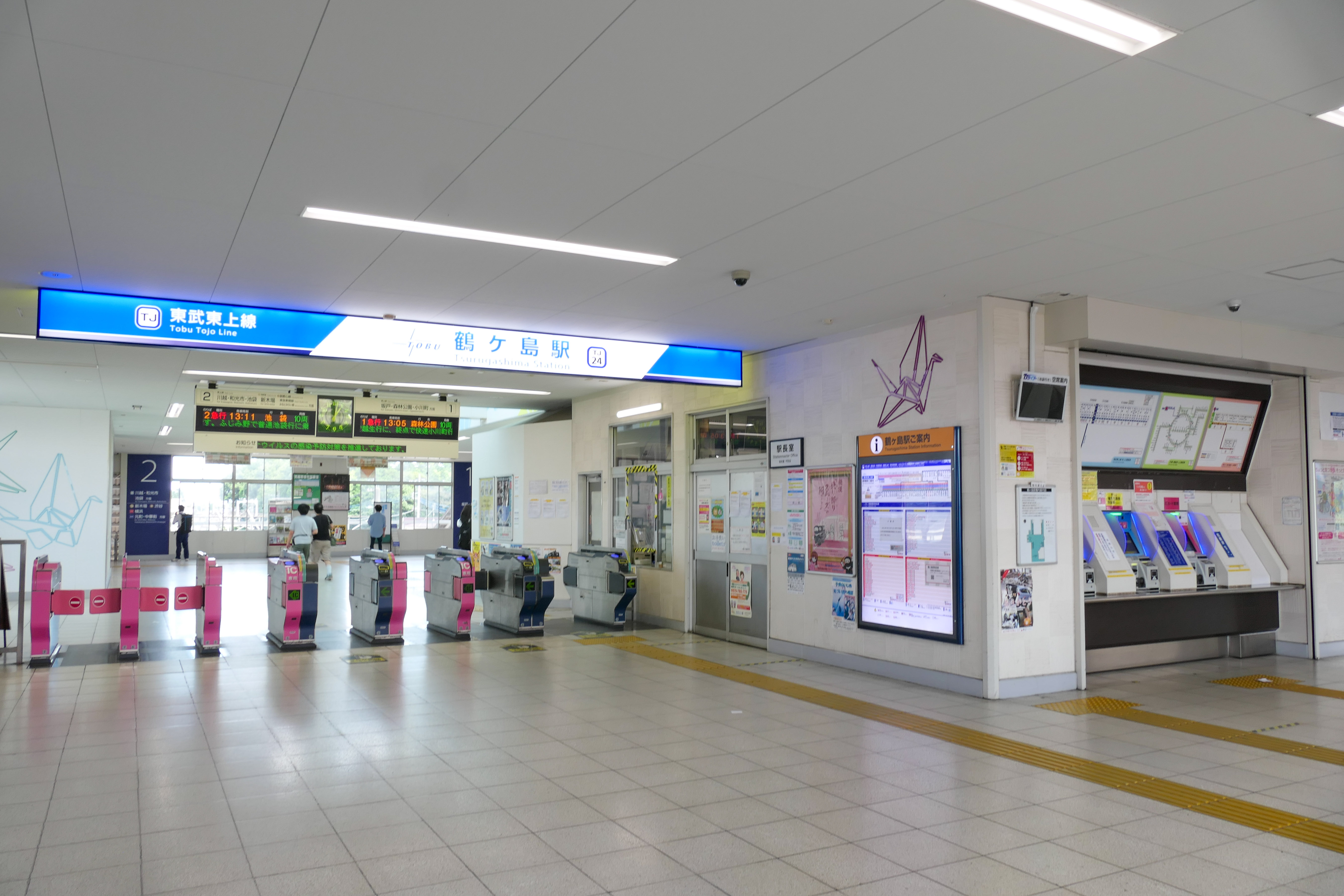
The ticket barriers in July 2021

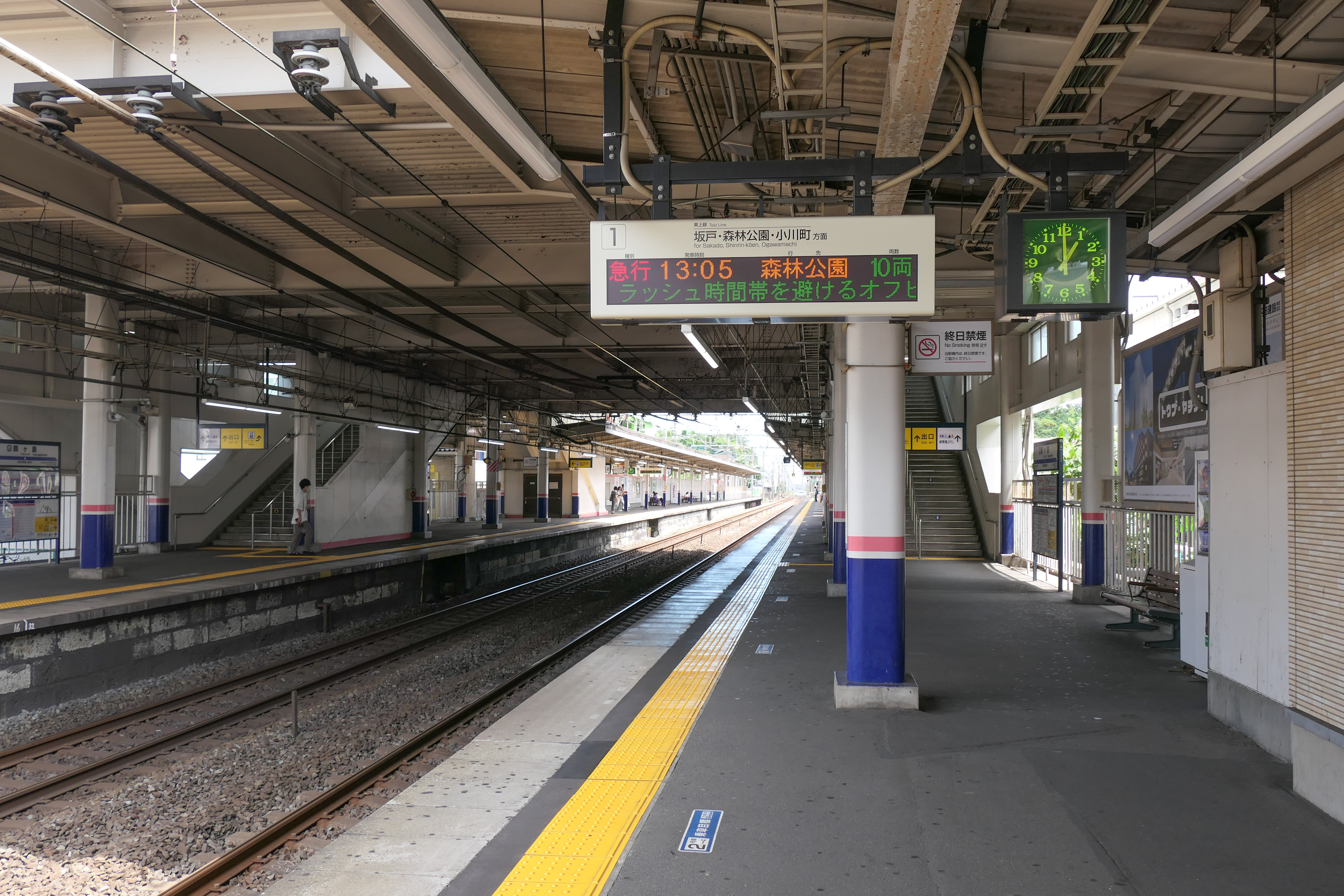
View of the platform 1 in July 2021

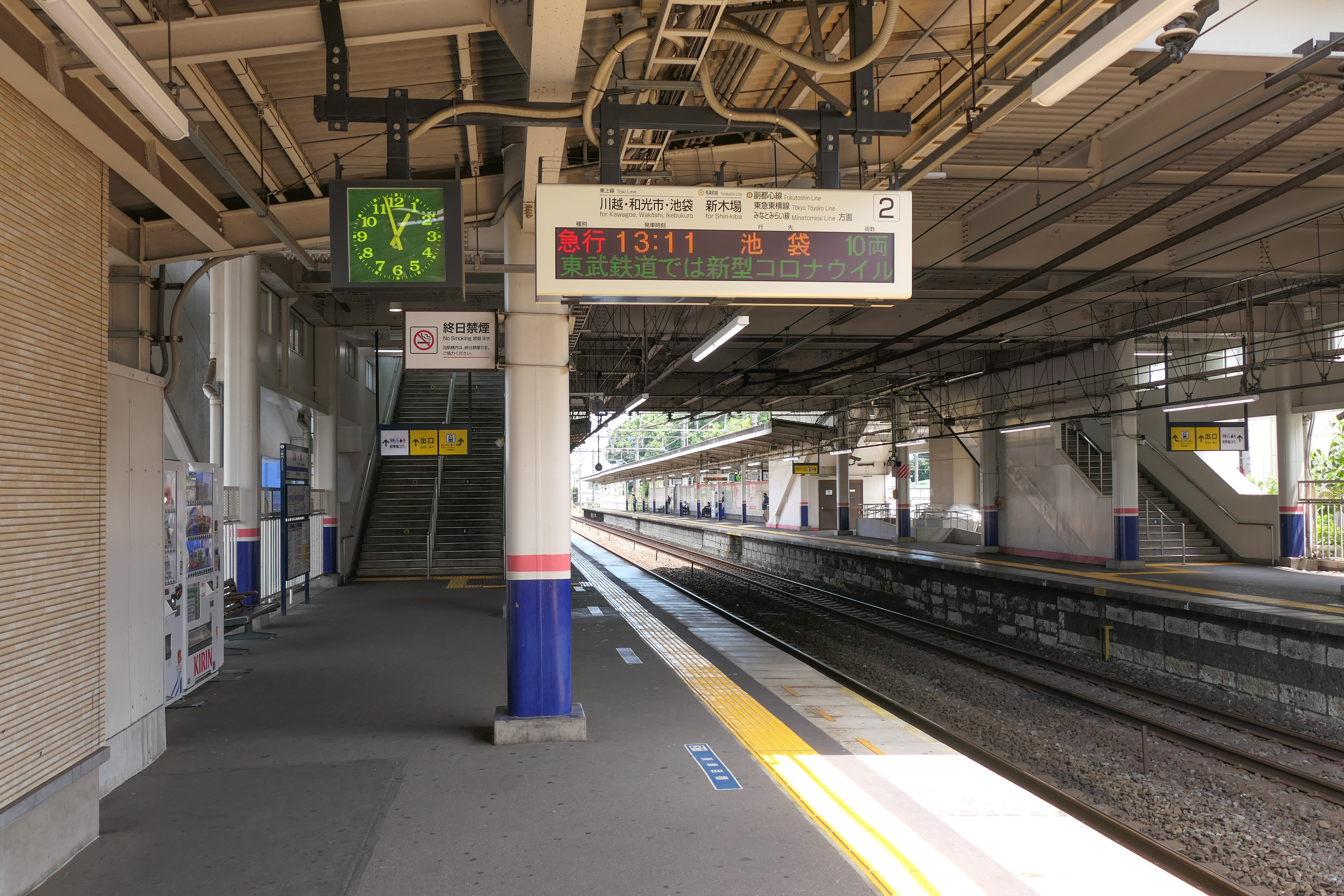
View of the platform 2 in July 2021

== History ==
The station opened on 10 April 1932.

From 17 March 2012, station numbering was introduced on the Tōbu Tōjō Line, with Tsurugashima Station becoming "TJ-24".

From March 2023, Tsurugashima Station became an Rapid Express service stop following the abolishment of the Rapid (快速, Kaisoku) services and reorganization of the Tōbu Tōjō Line services. In addition, through service via the Tōkyū Shin-yokohama Line, Sōtetsu Shin-yokohama Line, Sōtetsu Main Line, and Sōtetsu Izumino Line to Shin-Yokohama and Shōnandai commenced.

== Passenger statistics ==
In fiscal 2019, the station was used by an average of 33,039 passengers daily. The passenger figures for previous years are as shown below.

Fiscal year	Daily average
2010	34,636
2011	34,105
2012	34,105
2013	34,452

== Surrounding area ==
Tsurugashima Station lies on the boundary between the two cities of Kawagoe and Tsurugashima.

- Toyo University Kawagoe Campus

== See also ==
- List of railway stations in Japan
