= Kasumigaseki Station (Saitama) =

Railway station in Kawagoe, Saitama Prefecture, Japan

TJ23 Kasumigaseki Station 霞ヶ関駅
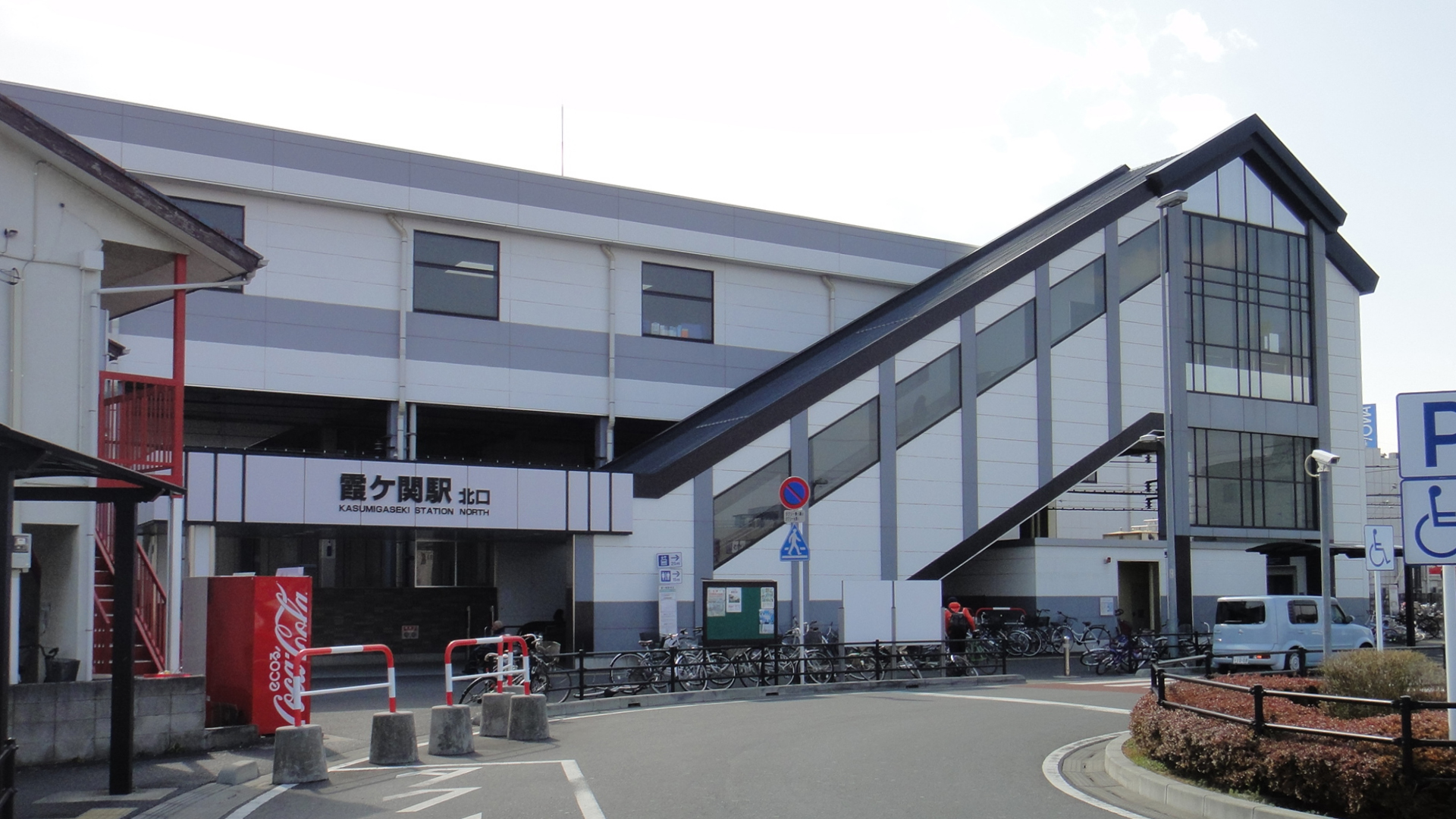
- The north entrance in March 2013

General information
- Location: 1-1-4 Kasumigaseki-higashi, Kawagoe-shi, Saitama-ken 350-1103; Japan
- Coordinates: 35°55′32″N 139°26′35″E
- Operator: Tōbu Railway
- Line: Tōbu Tōjō Line
- Distance: 34.8 km from Ikebukuro
- Platforms: 1 island platform
- Tracks: 2

Construction
- Cycle facilities: Yes

Other information
- Station code: TJ-23
- Website: Official website

History
- Opened: 27 October 1916
- Rebuilt: 2007–2008
- Former names: Matoba (until 1930)

Passengers
- FY2019: 29,021 daily

Services
Preceding station	Tobu Railway	Following station
Tsurugashima TJ24 towards Ogawamachi	F Liner	Kawagoeshi TJ22 towards Motomachi-Chūkagai
Tsurugashima TJ24 towards Yorii	Tojo Line Rapid Express Express Semi Express Local	Kawagoeshi TJ22 towards Ikebukuro
Location
- Location within Saitama Prefecture Location within Japan

Kasumigaseki Station (霞ヶ関駅, Kasumigaseki-eki) is a passenger railway station located in the city of Kawagoe, Saitama, Japan, operated by the private railway operator Tōbu Railway.

== Lines ==
Kasumigaseki Station is served by the Tōbu Tōjō Line from Ikebukuro in Tokyo. Located between Kawagoeshi and Tsurugashima, it is 34.8 km from the Ikebukuro terminus. Rapid Express, Express, Semi Express, and Local services stop at this station.

== Station layout ==
The station consists of a single island platform serving two tracks, with an elevated station building located above the platforms.

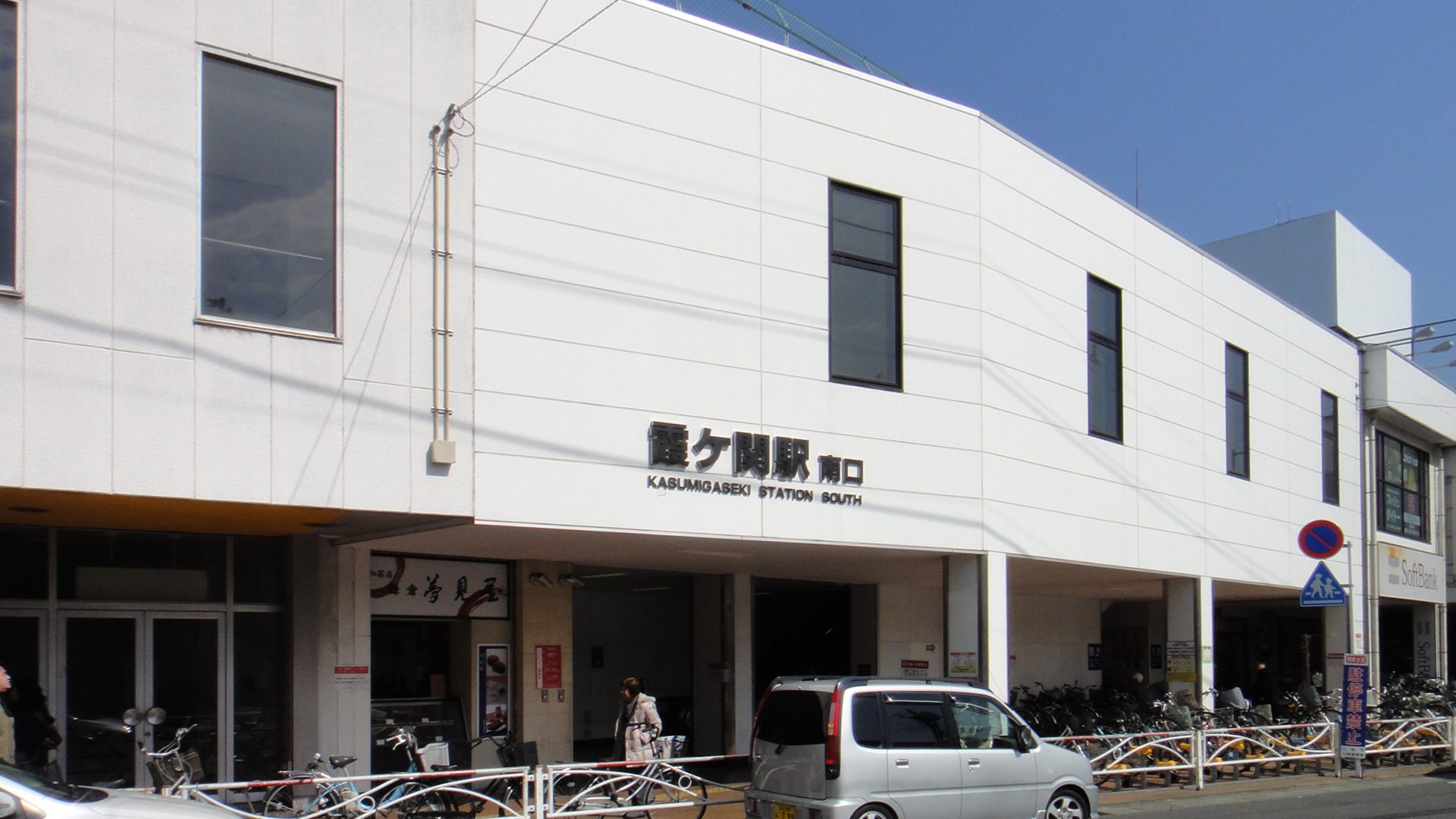
The south entrance in March 2013

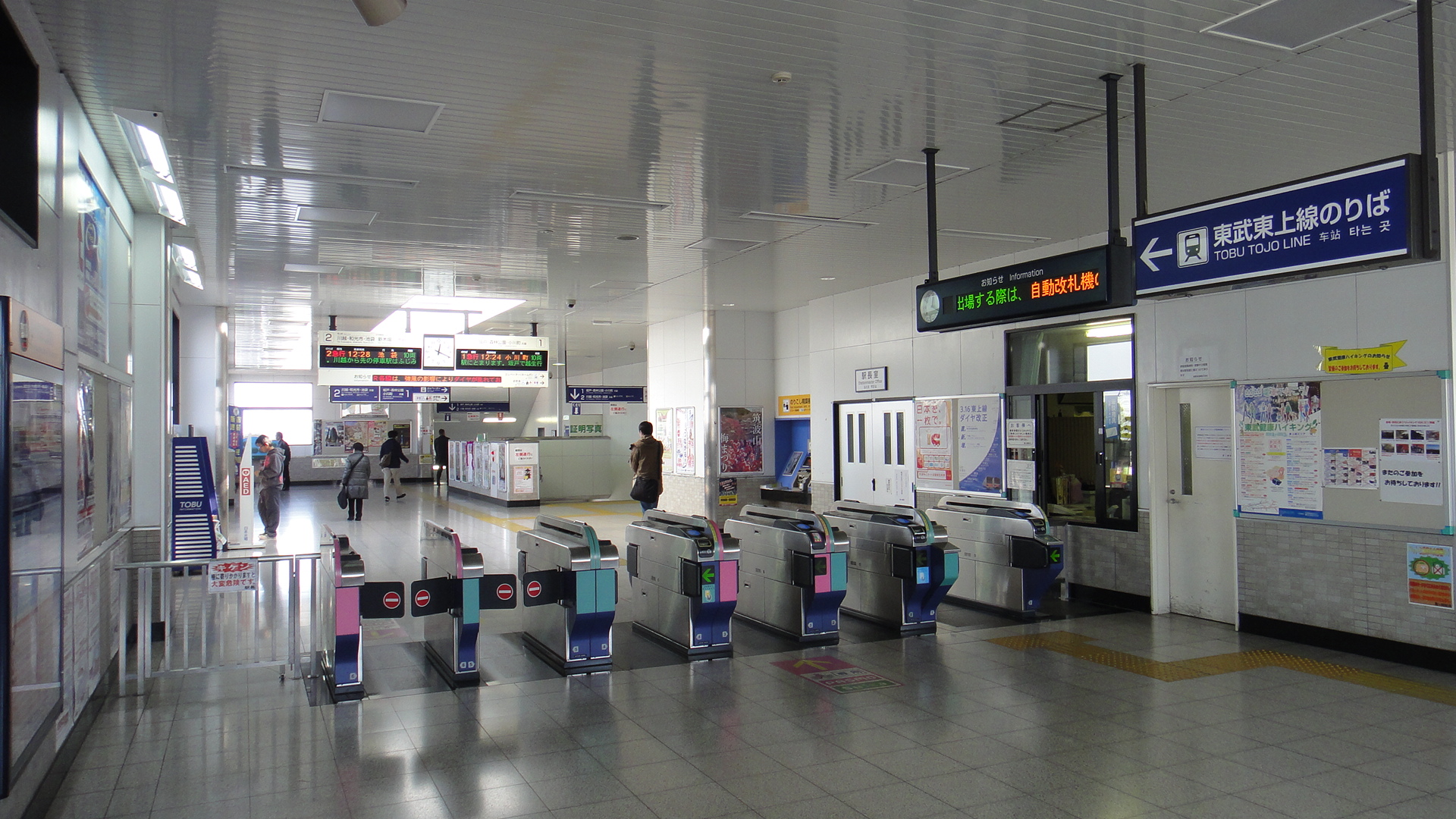
The ticket barriers in March 2013

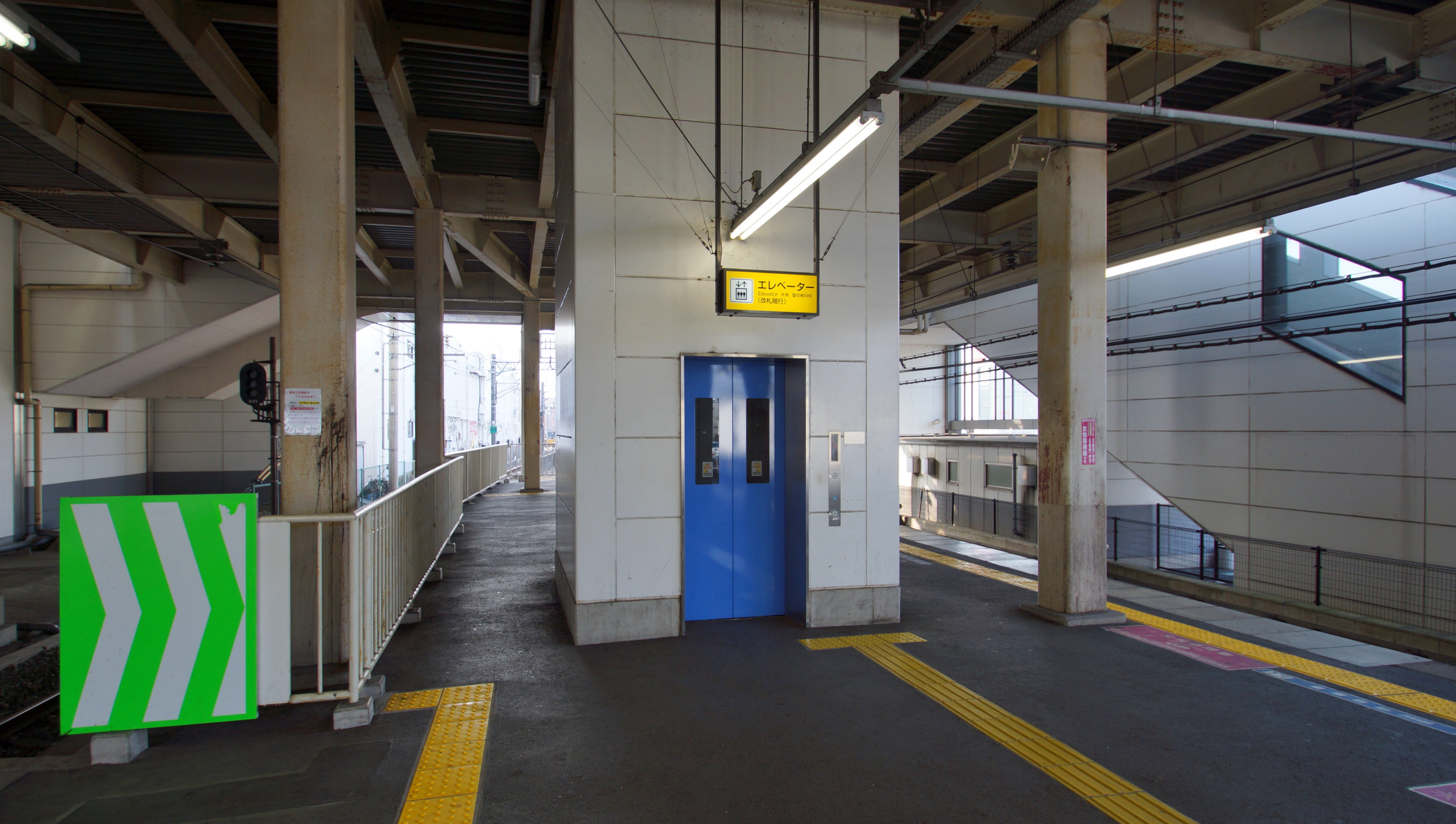
The passenger elevator on the platform in February 2016

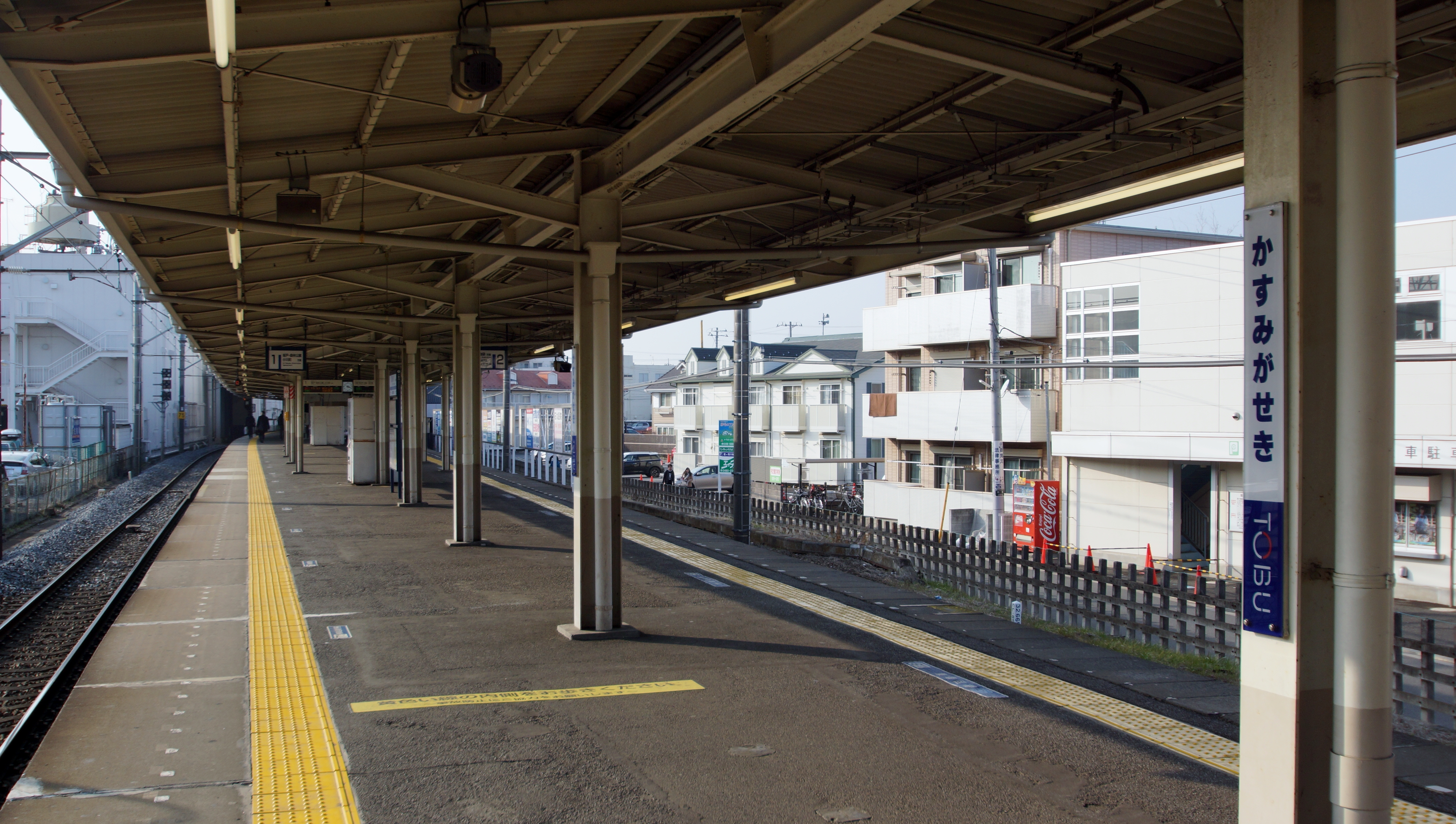
View of the platforms looking in the down direction in February 2016

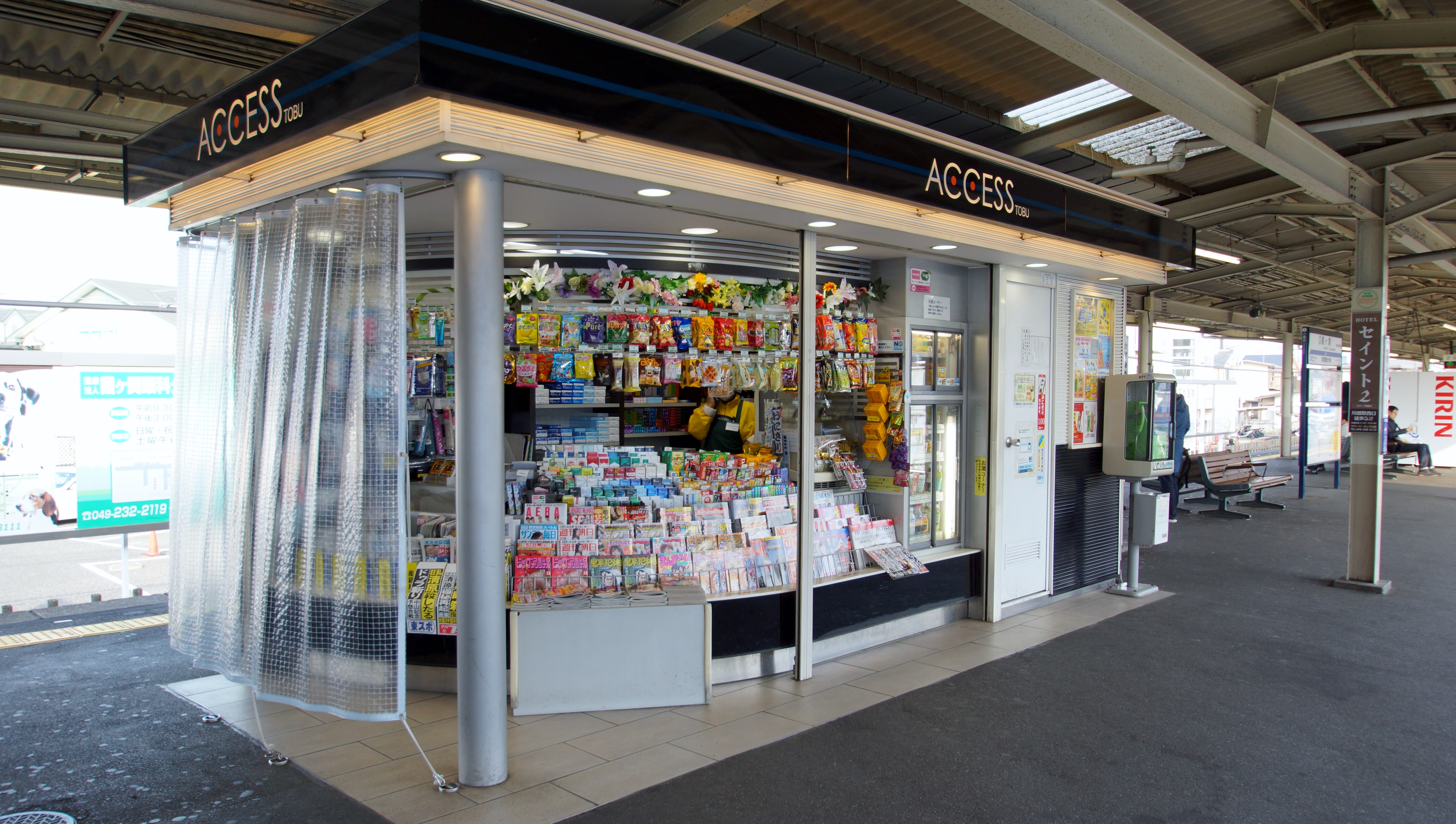
The kiosk on the platform in February 2016

=== Platforms ===
1	■ Tōbu Tōjō Line	for Sakado, Shinrinkōen, Ogawamachi, and Yorii
2	■ Tōbu Tōjō Line	for Kawagoe, Wakōshi, and Ikebukuro; Tokyo Metro Yurakucho Line for Shin-Kiba; Tokyo Metro Fukutoshin Line for Shibuya; Tōkyū Tōyoko Line for Hiyoshi and Yokohama; Tōkyū Shin-Yokohama Line for Shin-Yokohama via Sōtetsu Shin-Yokohama Line for Shōnandai; Minatomirai Line for Motomachi-Chukagai

== History ==
The station opened on 27 October 1916 as Matoba Station (的場駅) coinciding with the extension of the Tōjō Railway line from Kawagoe to Sakado-machi (now Sakado Station). It was renamed Kasumigaseki on 14 January 1930 following the opening of the nearby Kasumigaseki Country Club in 1929. Later, in 1940, the former name was reassigned to Matoba Station on the Kawagoe Line.

A track operated by Saitama Prefecture formerly led from this station to a gravel excavation site on the nearby Iruma River, but this was closed in 1957.

The platform was previously linked to the station building on the south side by an underground passage, but in 2007, the station was rebuilt with the station facilities relocated above the platforms. In 2008, an entrance was also added on the north side of the station.

From 17 March 2012, station numbering was introduced on the Tōbu Tōjō Line, with Kasumigaseki Station becoming "TJ-23".

From March 2023, Kasumigaseki Station became an Rapid Express service stop following the abolishment of the Rapid (快速, Kaisoku) services and reorganization of the Tōbu Tōjō Line services. In addition, through service via the Tōkyū Shin-yokohama Line, Sōtetsu Shin-yokohama Line, Sōtetsu Main Line, and Sōtetsu Izumino Line to Shin-Yokohama and Shōnandai commenced.

== Passenger statistics ==
In fiscal 2019, the station was used by an average of 29,021 passengers daily. The passenger figures for previous years are as shown below.

Fiscal year	Daily average
2010	28,762
2014	28,817
2015	29,448

== Surrounding area ==
- Iruma River
- Tokyo International University
- Kasumigaseki Senior High School
- Tobu Kasumi Driving School
- Kawagoe West Culture Hall

== See also ==
- List of railway stations in Japan
- Kasumigaseki Station (Tokyo), a station in Tokyo with the same name
