= Tsurugashima =

Tsurugashima 鶴ヶ島市
- City
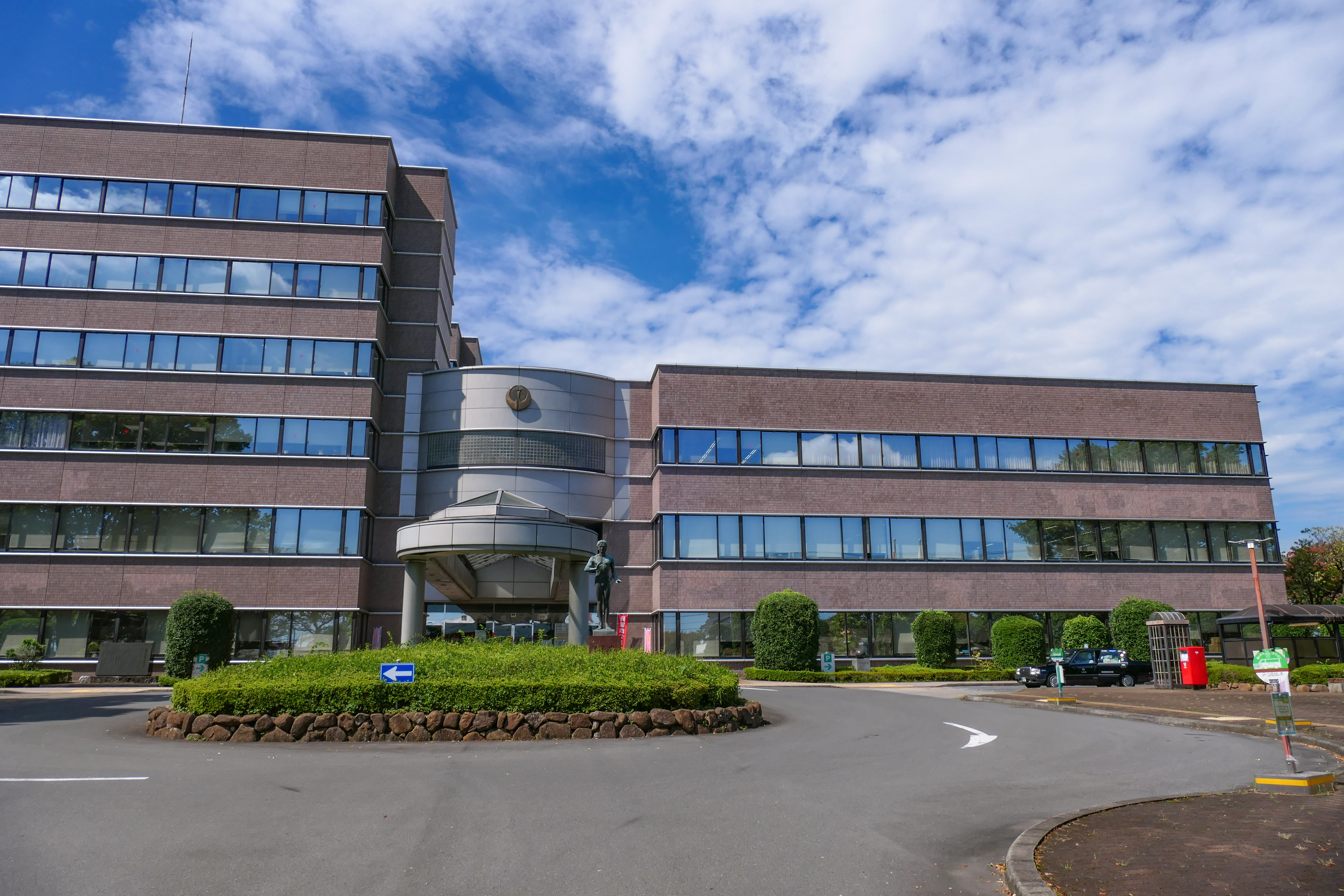
- Tsurugashima city hall

- Flag Seal

- Location of Tsurugashima in Saitama Prefecture

- Coordinates: 35°56′4.2″N 139°23′35.1″E
- Country: Japan
- Region: Kantō
- Prefecture: Saitama

Government
  - Mayor: Hiromi Ogawa（小川尋海）- from November 2025

Area
  - Total: 17.65 km^{2} (6.81 sq mi)

Population (January 2021)
  - Total: 69,937
  - Density: 3,962/km^{2} (10,260/sq mi)
- Time zone: UTC+9 (Japan Standard Time)
- Tree: Pine
- Flower: Azalea
- -Elevation: 40.66m
- Phone number: 049-271-1111
- Address: 16-1 Mitsugi, Tsurugashima-shi, Saitama-ken 350-2292
- Website: Official website

Tsurugashima (鶴ヶ島市, Tsurugashima-shi) is a city in Saitama Prefecture, Japan. On January 1, 2021, the city had an estimated population of 69,937 in 31,890 households and a population density of 4,000 per square kilometre (10,000/sq mi). The total area of the city is 17.65 square kilometres (6.81 sq mi).

== Geography ==
Tsurugashima is located in the geographic center of Saitama Prefecture. Tsurugashima Station is approximately 40 minutes from Ikebukuro Station in Tokyo on the Tōbu Tōjō Line by direct express train. Tsurugashima is located at the tip of the Iruma Plateau, and the elevation is about 30 to 50 meters above sea level, gently descending from the southwest to the northeast.

=== Surrounding municipalities ===
- Saitama Prefecture
  - Hidaka
  - Kawagoe
  - Sakado

=== Climate ===
Tsurugashima has a humid subtropical climate (Köppen Cfa) characterized by warm summers and cool winters with light to no snowfall. The average annual temperature in Tsurugashima is 13.9 °C. The average annual rainfall is 1448 mm with September as the wettest month. The temperatures are highest on average in August, at around 25.6 °C, and lowest in January, at around 2.3 °C.

== Demographics ==
Per Japanese census data, the population of Tsurugashima has recently plateaued after several decades of strong growth.

Historical population
Year	Pop.	±%
1950	6,826	—
1960	7,008	+2.7%
1970	14,643	+108.9%
1980	35,842	+144.8%
1990	63,064	+76.0%
2000	67,638	+7.3%
2010	69,990	+3.5%
2020	70,117	+0.2%

== History ==
The area around Tsurugashima has been inhabited since prehistoric times, and a number of large burial mounds from the Kofun period are preserved within the city limits. During the Edo period, the area was largely under the control of Kawagoe Domain. The village of Tsurugashima was created within Koma District, Saitama with the establishment of the modern municipalities system on April 1, 1889. Koma District was abolished in 1896, becoming part of Iruma District.Tsurugashima was elevated to town status on April 1, 1966. The city of Tsurugashima was founded when the former town of Tsurugashima was elevated to city status on September 1, 1991.

== Government ==
Tsurugashima has a mayor-council form of government with a directly elected mayor and a unicameral city council of 18 members. Tsurugashima contributes one member to the Saitama Prefectural Assembly. In terms of national politics, the city is part of Saitama 10th district of the lower house of the Diet of Japan.

== Economy ==
Formerly an agricultural community, Tsurugashima has increasingly become a bedroom community, with over a third of its population commuting to the Tokyo metropolis or the city of Kawagoe.

== Education ==
Tsurugashima has eight public elementary schools and five public middle schools operated by the city government, and one public high school operated by the Saitama Prefectural Board of Education.

== Transportation ==
=== Railway ===
Tōbu Railway - Tōbu Tōjō Line

- Tsurugashima

Tōbu Railway - Tōbu Ogose Line

- Ippommatsu

=== Highway ===
- Ken-Ō Expressway – Ken-Ō Tsurugashima Interchange, Tsurugashima Junction
- Kan-etsu Expressway – Tsurugashima Interchange, Tsurugashima Junction
- National Route 407

=== Bus ===
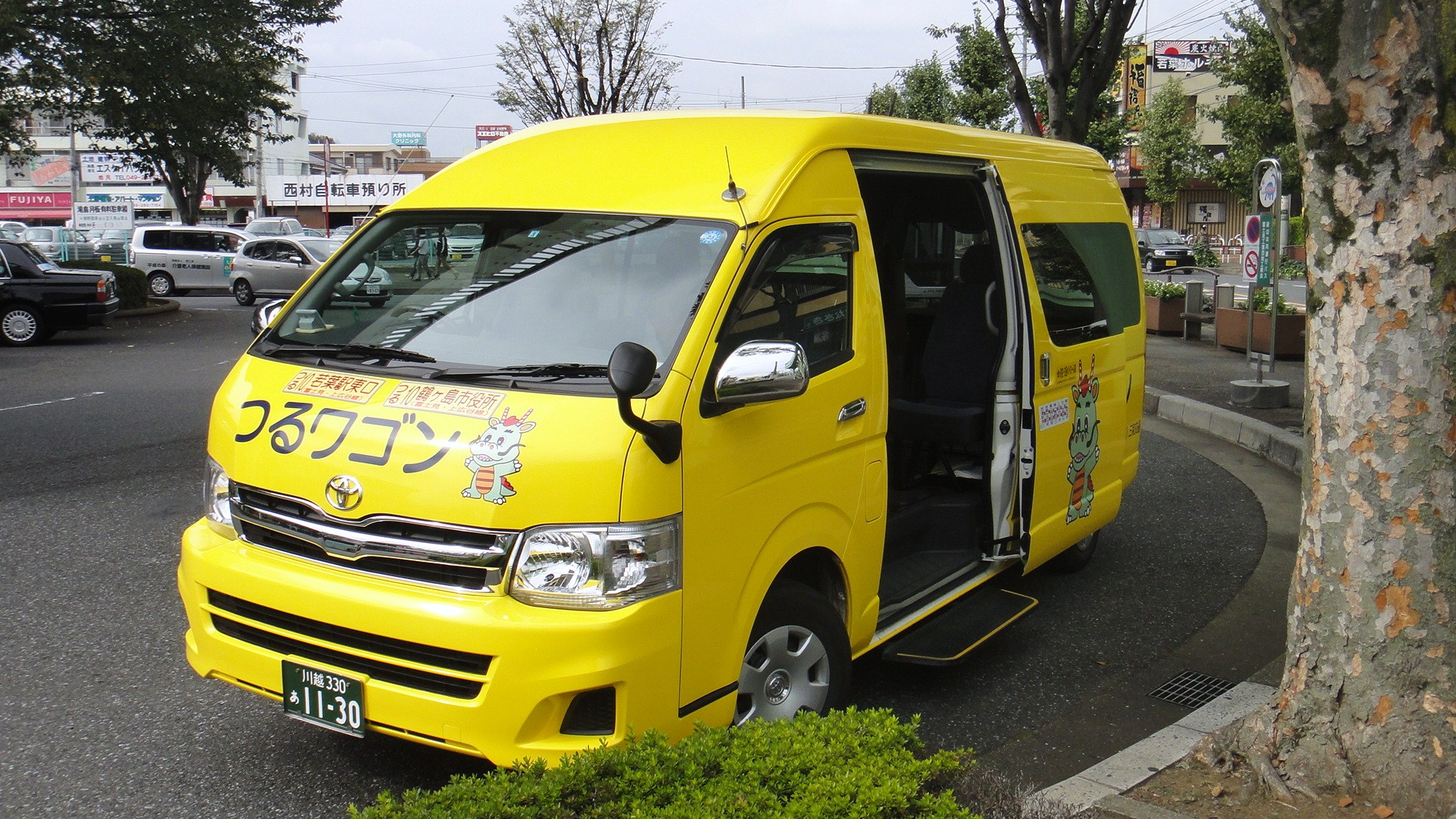
Tsuru Wagon community minibus in front of Wakaba Station, October 2011

- Tsuru Bus community bus service
- Tsuru Wagon community minibus service

== Local attractions ==
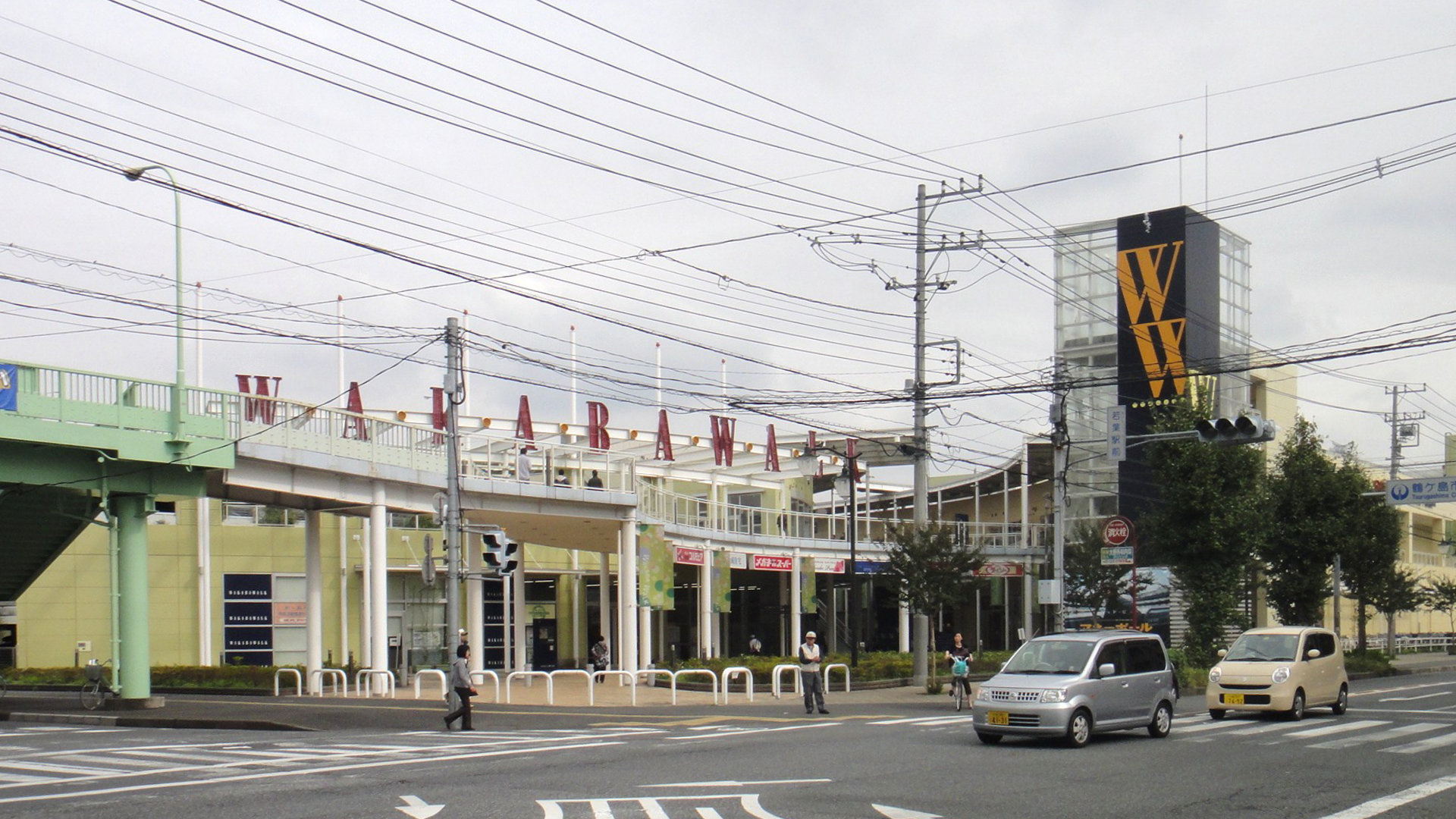
Wakaba Walk shopping centre in front of Wakaba Station, October 2011

- Wakaba Walk Shopping Centre
- Zennōji Temple

== Notable people from Tsurugashima ==
- Aria Jasuru Hasegawa, footballer
- Jin Katagiri, comedian and member of the Rahmens duo
- Ryuji Kawai, footballer
- Atsuko Sakurai, actress
- Haruka Shimazaki, actress and former AKB48 member
- Hideaki Takeda, footballer
- Jun Uruno, footballer
