= Tokyo Metro 07 series =

Japanese train type

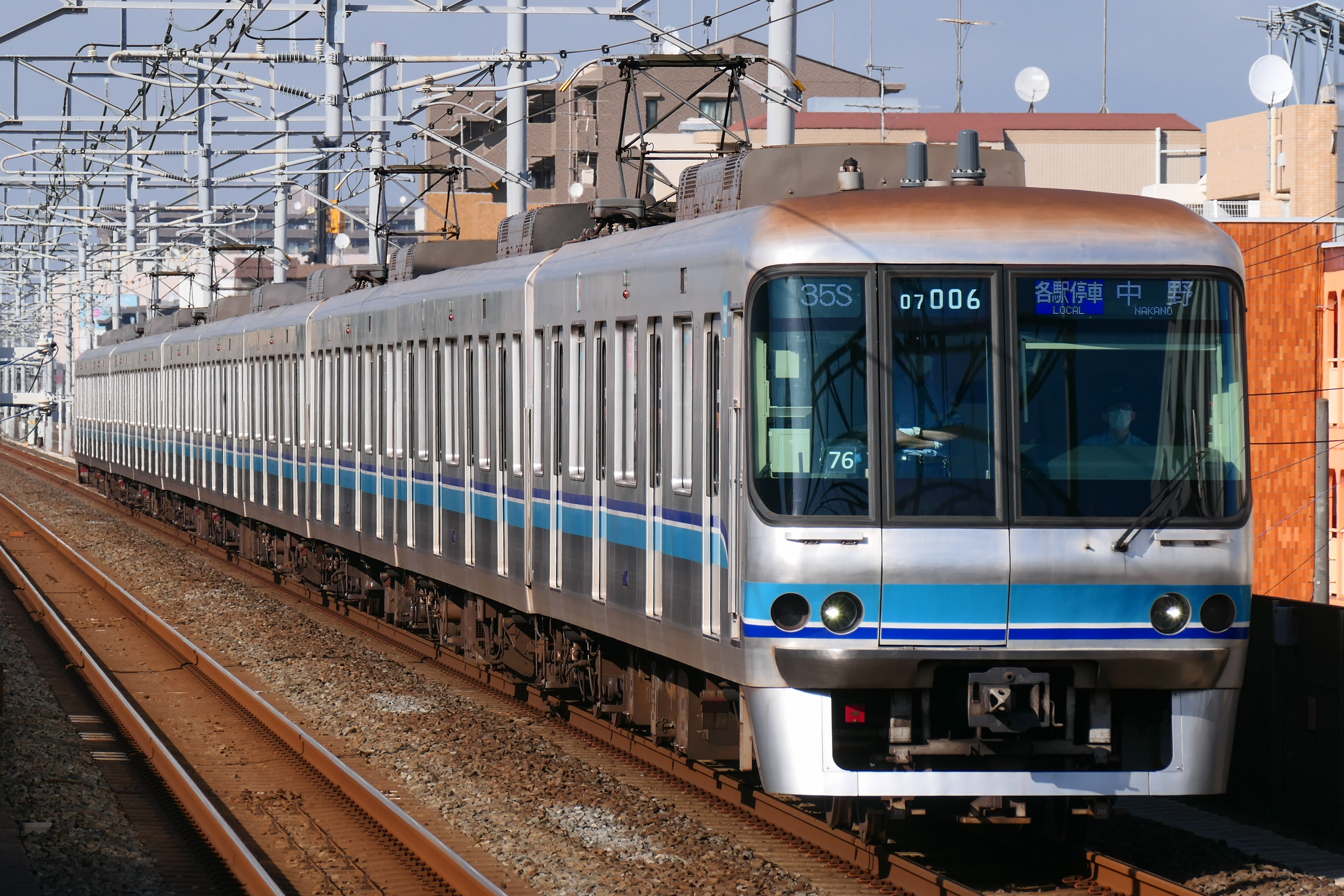
- Tōzai Line refurbished 07 series set
- In service: 1993–present
- Manufacturers: Kawasaki Heavy Industries and Nippon Sharyo
- Replaced: 5000 series
- Constructed: 1993–1994
- Entered service: 18 March 1993
- Refurbished: 2018–
- Number built: 60 vehicles (6 sets)
- Number in service: 60 vehicles (6 sets)
- Formation: 10 cars per trainset
- Fleet numbers: 71–76
- Capacity: 1494 (520 seated)
- Operator: Tokyo Metro
- Depot: Fukagawa
- Lines served: Tokyo Metro Tōzai Line; JR East Chūō-Sōbu Line; Tōyō Rapid Line; Former operations: Tokyo Metro Yurakucho Line (until 2007); Seibu Ikebukuro Line (until 2007); Seibu Yūrakuchō Line (until 2007); Tobu Tojo Line (until 2007); Tokyo Metro Chiyoda Line (2008); JR East Joban Line (2008)

Specifications
- Car body construction: Aluminium
- Car length: 20.070 m (65 ft 10.2 in) (end cars); 20.000 m (65 ft 7.4 in) (intermediate cars)
- Width: 2.800 m (9 ft 2.2 in)
- Height: 4.092 m (13 ft 5.1 in) (control and trailer cars), 4.140 m (13 ft 7.0 in) (intermediate powered cars)
- Doors: 4 pairs per side
- Maximum speed: 100 km/h (62 mph)
- Traction system: IGBT–VVVF, SiC–VVVF
- Transmission: Westinghouse Natal (WN) drive; Gear ratio: 7.79 : 1
- Acceleration: 3.3 km/(h⋅s) (2.1 mph/s)
- Deceleration: 3.5 km/(h⋅s) (2.2 mph/s) (service); 5.0 km/(h⋅s) (3.1 mph/s) (emergency)
- Electric systems: 1,500 V DC
- Current collection: Pantograph
- Bogies: SS135, SS035
- Braking system: Electronically controlled pneumatic brakes with regenerative braking
- Safety systems: New CS-ATC/CS-ATC (Tokyo Metro Tozai Line), ATS-P (Chūō-Sōbu Line), WS-ATC (Tōyō Rapid Railway)
- Coupling system: Shibata
- Track gauge: 1,067 mm (3 ft 6 in)

The Tokyo Metro 07 series (東京メトロ07系, Tōkyō Metoro 07-kei) is an electric multiple unit (EMU) train type operated by Tokyo Metro in Tokyo, Japan. Introduced into service in 1993, a total of six 10-car sets were manufactured by Kawasaki Heavy Industries and Nippon Sharyo between 1993 and 1994 for use on the Tokyo Metro Yūrakuchō Line. From 2006, the sets were permanently transferred to the Tokyo Metro Tōzai Line to replace ageing 5000 series trainsets.

== Operations ==
=== Current ===
- Tokyo Metro Tōzai Line
- Tōyō Rapid Line between Nishi-Funabashi Station and Tōyō-Katsutadai Station
- JR Chūō-Sōbu Line between Nakano Station and Mitaka Station
- JR Chūō-Sōbu Line between Nishi-Funabashi Station and Tsudanuma Station (weekday mornings and evenings only)

=== Former ===
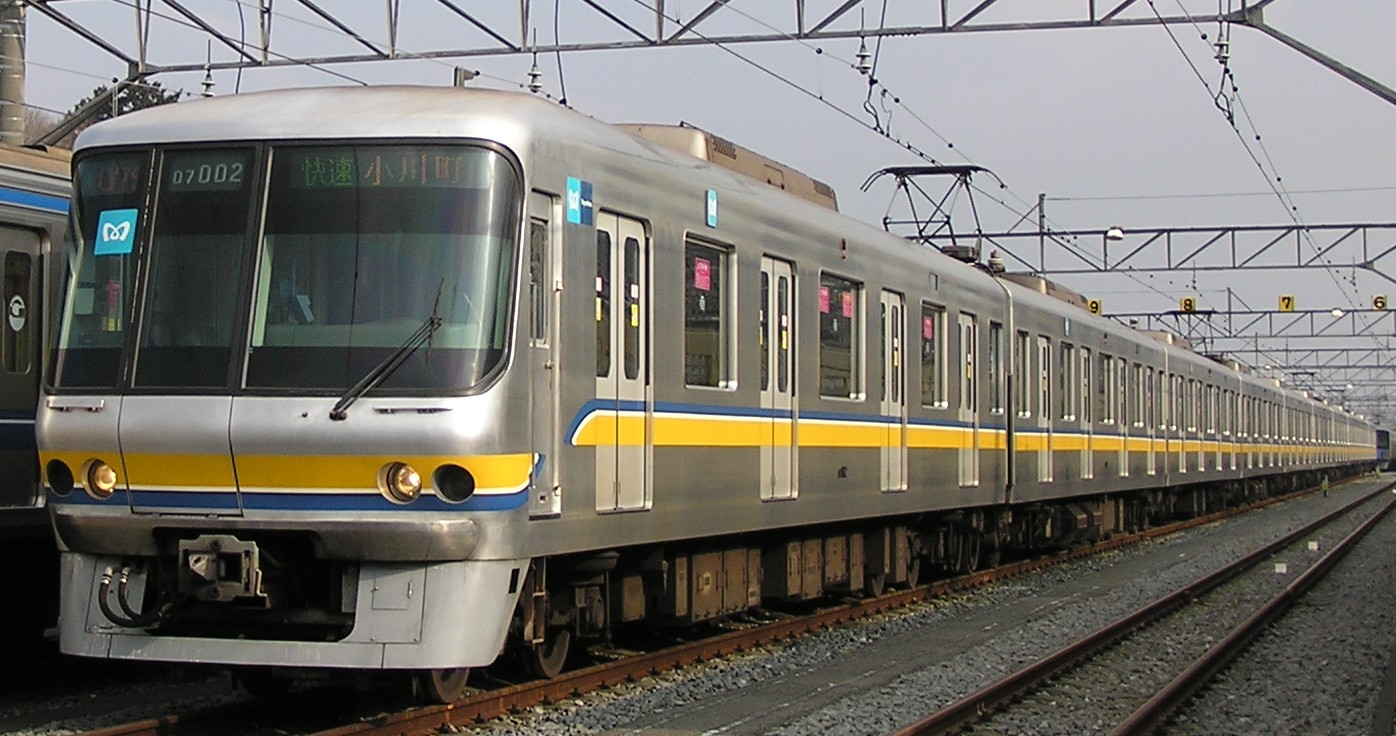
07 series set in original Yurakucho Line colour scheme at Kotesashi Depot, February 2007

- Tokyo Metro Yurakucho Line between Wakōshi and Shin-Kiba (from 1992 until 2008); during that period the 07 series EMUs also inter-ran into the Tobu Tojo Line to Kawagoeshi and on the Seibu Yūrakuchō Line and Seibu Ikebukuro Line to Hannō Station via Nerima Station
- Tokyo Metro Chiyoda Line (Set 07-101, September – December 2008)

== Formation ==
The six 10-cars sets, numbered 71 to 76, are formed as shown below, with car 1 at the west (Nishi-Funabashi) end.

Car No.	1	2	3	4	5	6	7	8	9	10
Designation	CT1	M1	T'	M2	Tc1	Tc2	M3	T	M1	CT2
Numbering	07 100	07 200	07 300	07 400	07 500	07 600	07 700	07 800	07 900	07 000

Cars 2, 4, 7, and 9 each have one lozenge-type pantograph.

== Interior ==
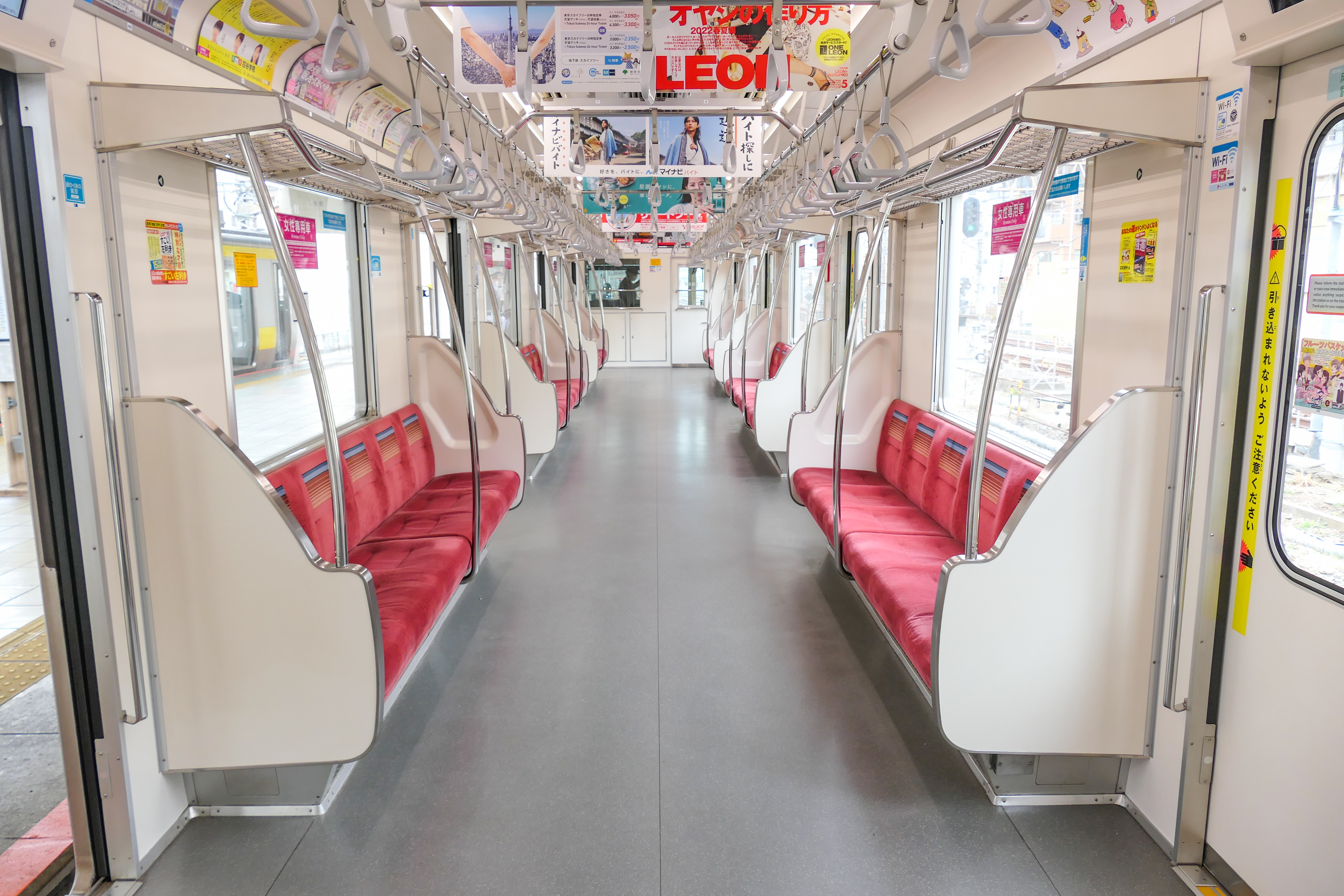
Interior view

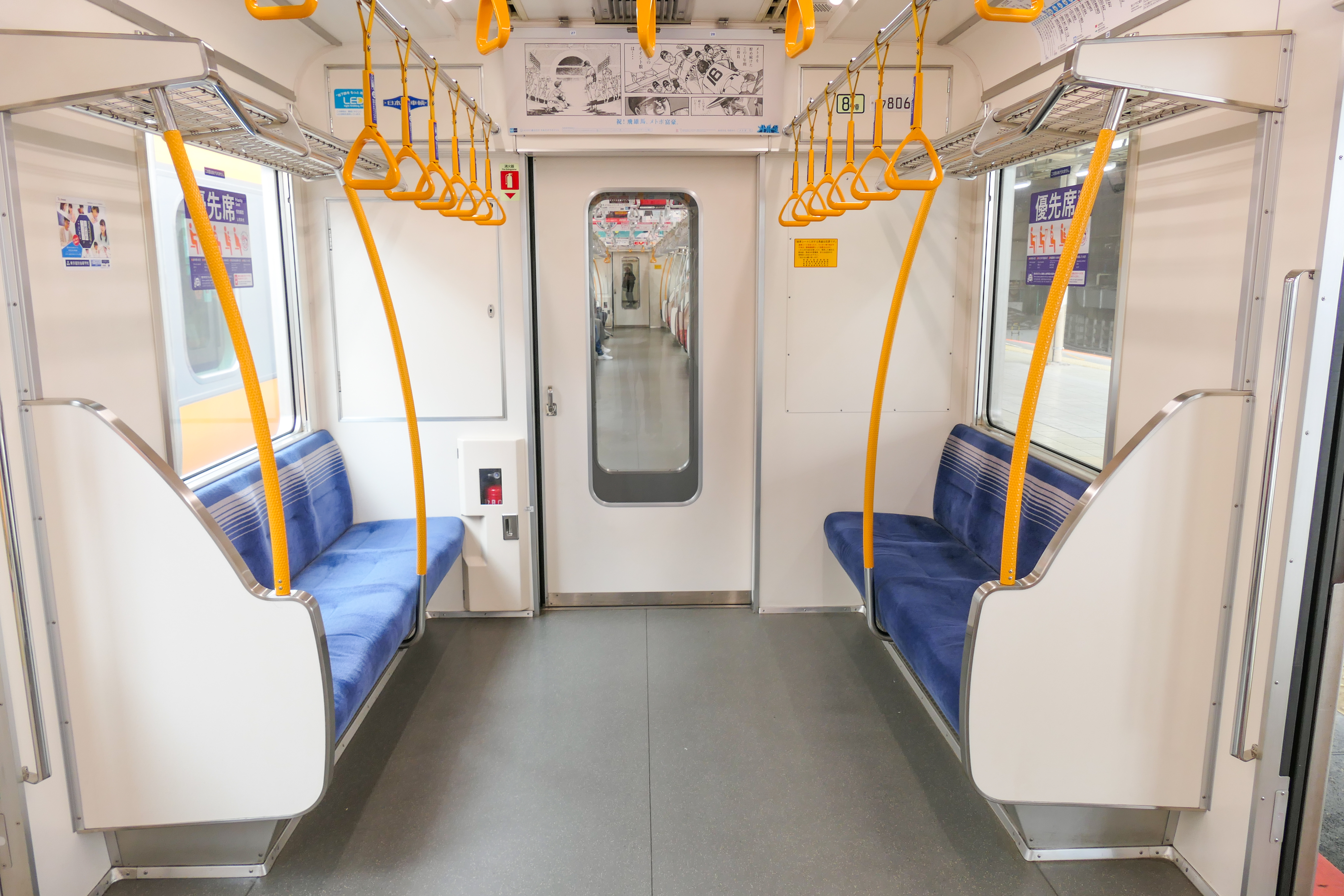
Priority seating

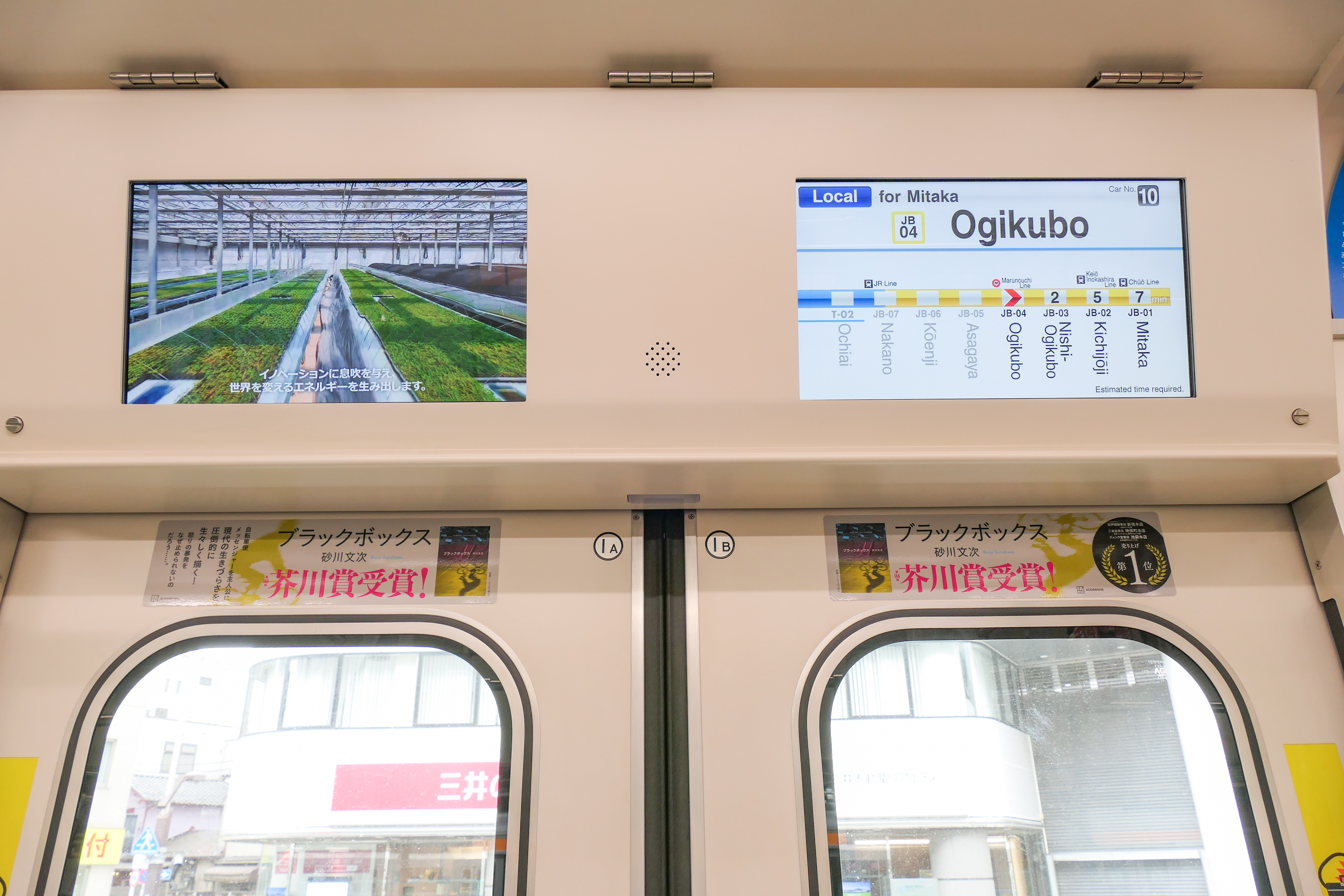
LCD passenger information screens

== Driver's cab ==
The front ends have an emergency exit. Headlights and taillights are round. Sets are fitted with skirts. These were modified on sets transferred to the Tōzai Line.

The trains originally had a two-handle control system. Tōzai Line sets were modified with a single-handle (left-hand) system on transfer to the Tōzai Line. The Tōzai Line sets have a master controller which incorporates a deadman system which applies the brakes if the master controller is released by the driver.

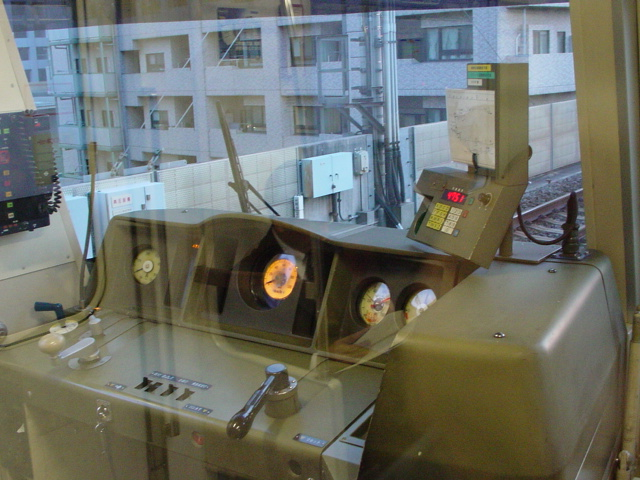
The driver's cab of a Yūrakuchō Line 07 series set, showing the two-handle control system

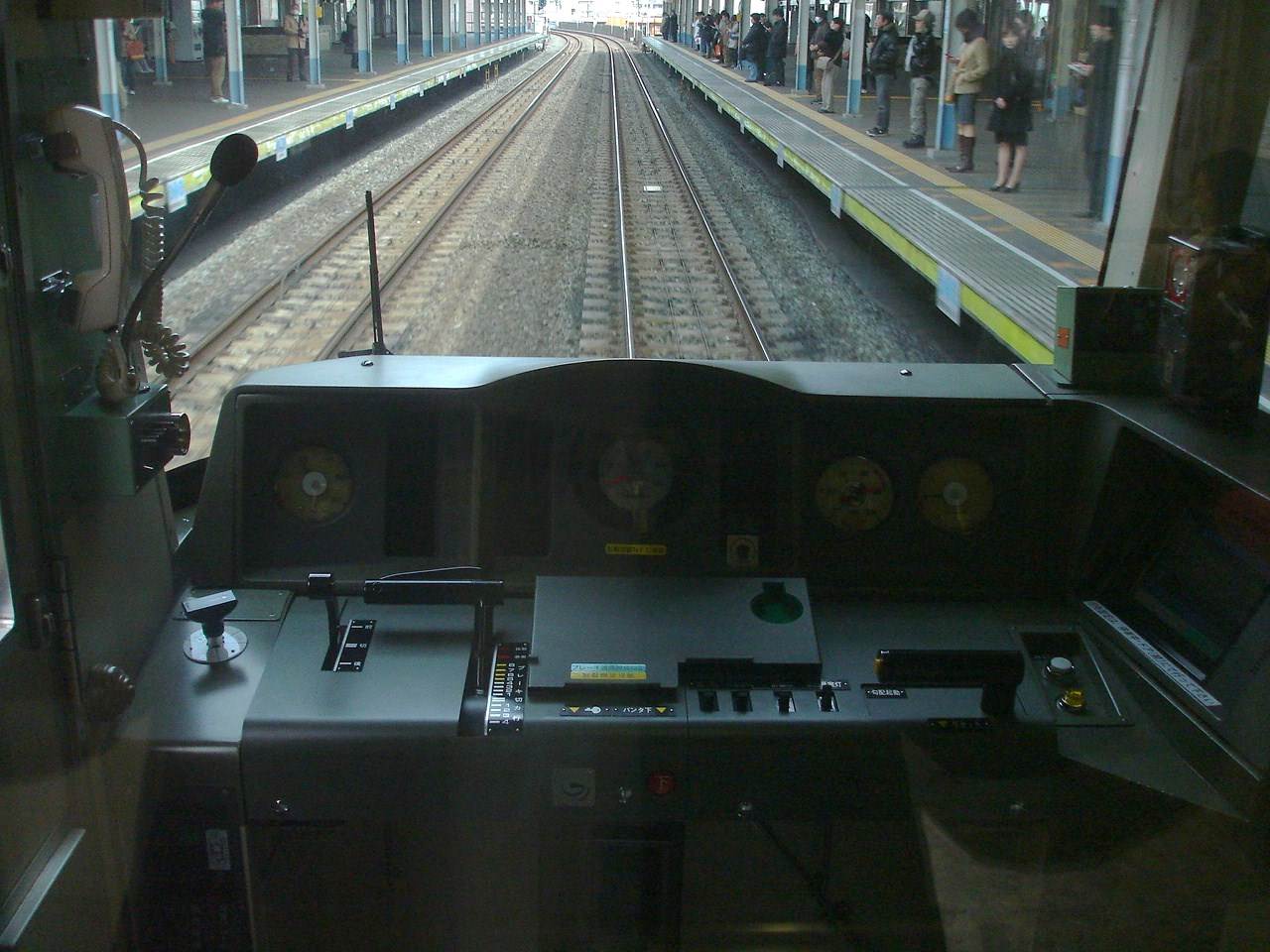
The driver's cab of a Tōzai Line 07 series set

== History ==
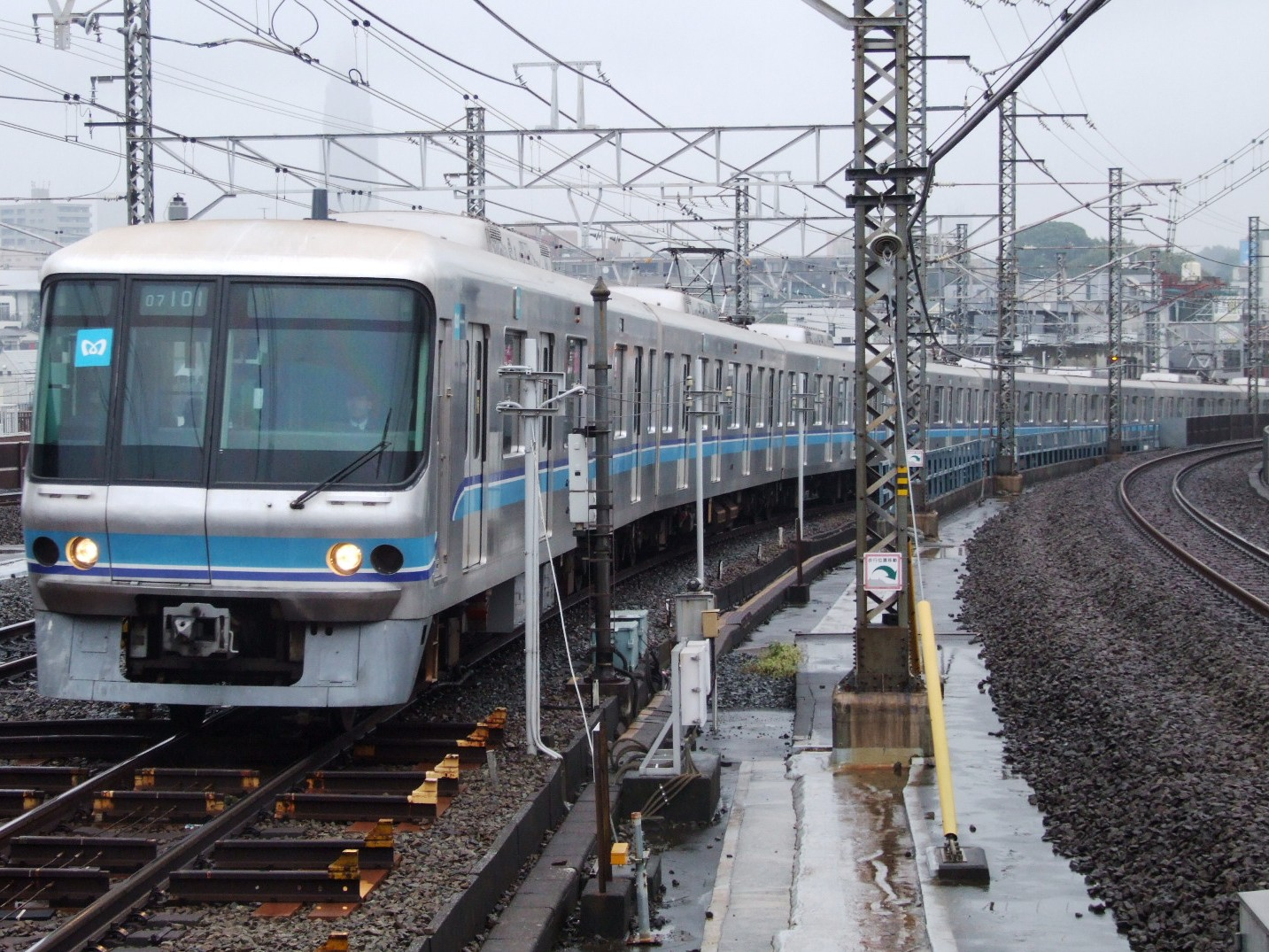
Set 07-101 on Tokyo Metro Chiyoda Line service, September 2008

The first sets (07-101 and 07-102) were introduced in 1992. Four more sets (07-103 to 07-106) were delivered in 1994. The six 10-car sets were initially all based on the Tokyo Metro Yūrakuchō Line, but with the introduction of the 10000 series, between July 2006 and March 2007, four sets (07-103 to 07-106) were transferred to the Tokyo Metro Tōzai Line to replace ageing 5000 series trains, and were repainted into that line's color scheme with light blue waistline stripes. The two remaining Yurakucho Line sets (07-101 and 07-102) were stored out-of-use from October 2007. Set 07-101 was subsequently repainted into the Tōzai Line colours at Shin-Kiba Works, and temporarily reallocated to the Tokyo Metro Chiyoda Line from September until December 2008.

=== Refurbishment ===
Beginning in 2018, the 07 series fleet has undergone a programme of refurbishment, also known as "class B repair". The programme included the installation of LED lighting throughout, full-colour destination displays, and updated door chimes and flooring. The first set to undergo refurbishment (07-103) returned to service on the Tozai Line on 15 August 2018, and on the Chūō-Sōbu and Tōyō Rapid lines on 25 October of that year.
