= Tokyo Metro 10000 series =

Electric multiple unit train type operated in Japan

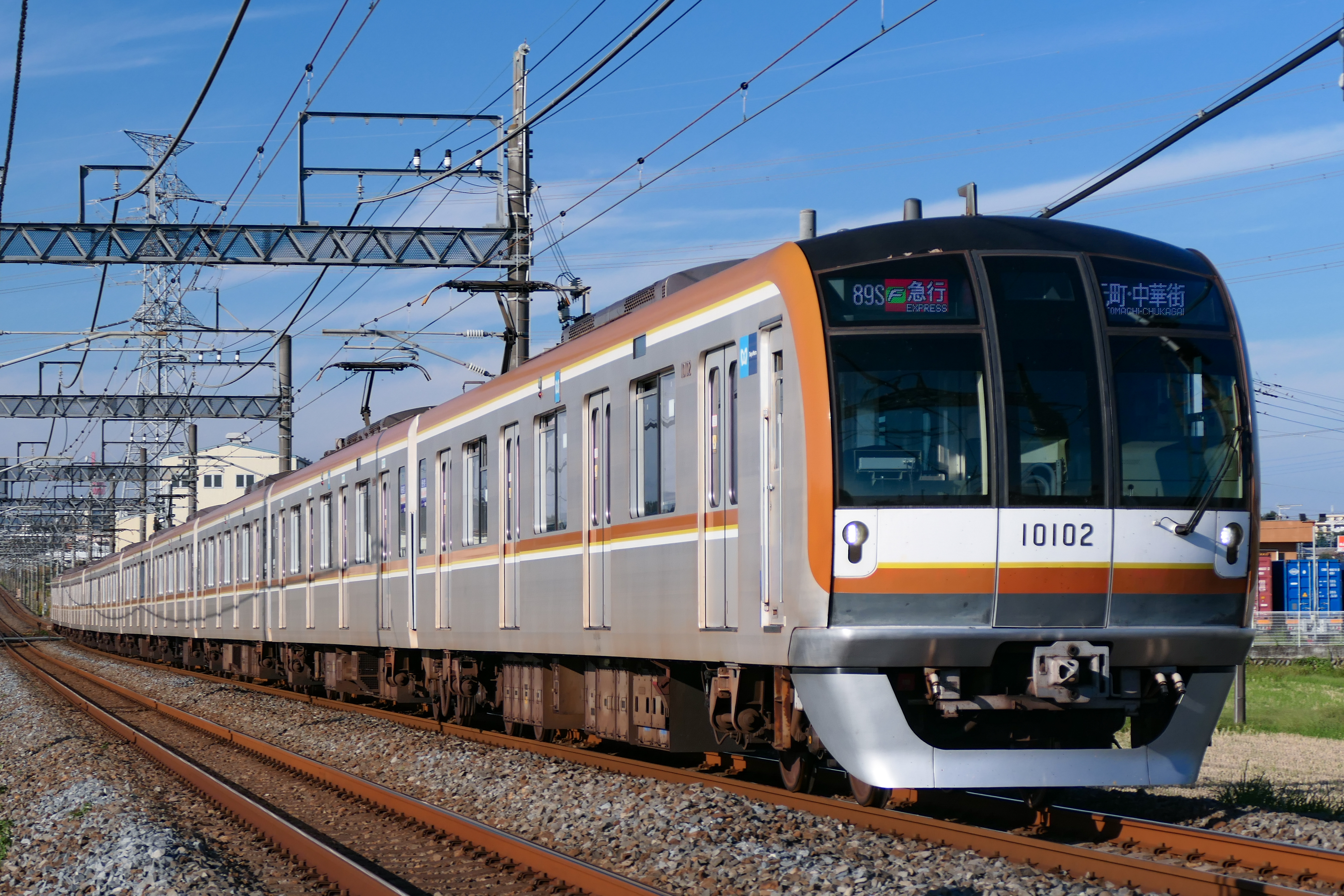
- A Yūrakuchō and Fukutoshin Lines 10000 series train
- In service: 2006–present
- Manufacturer: Hitachi
- Family name: A-train
- Replaced: Tokyo Metro 7000 series
- Constructed: 2006–2010
- Entered service: 1 September 2006
- Number built: 360 vehicles (36 sets)
- Number in service: 360 vehicles (36 sets)
- Formation: 10 cars per trainset
- Fleet numbers: 01–36
- Capacity: 1,518 passengers; 522 seated (10-car configuration)
- Operator: Tokyo Metro
- Lines served: Tokyo Metro Yurakucho Line; Tokyo Metro Fukutoshin Line; Tobu Tojo Line; Seibu Yurakucho Line; Seibu Ikebukuro Line; Tokyu Toyoko Line; Minatomirai Line

Specifications
- Car body construction: Aluminium
- Car length: 20,470 mm (67 ft 2 in) (end cars); 20,000 mm (65 ft 7 in) (intermediate cars)
- Width: 2,800 mm (9 ft 2 in)
- Height: 4,045 mm (13 ft 3.3 in)
- Doors: 4 pairs per side
- Maximum speed: 80 km/h (50 mph) (Tokyo Metro lines); 105 km/h (65 mph) (Seibu lines); 100 km/h (62 mph) (Tobu lines); 120 km/h (75 mph) (design)
- Weight: 294.8 t (290.1 long tons; 325.0 short tons)
- Traction system: Mitsubishi IGBT–VVVF inverter PG sensorless control MAP-178-15V150, MAP-174-15V151
- Traction motors: 20 × MM-I11A2 165 kW (221 hp) 3-phase AC induction motor
- Power output: 3.3 MW (4,425 hp)
- Acceleration: 3.3 km/(h⋅s) (2.1 mph/s)
- Deceleration: 3.5 km/(h⋅s) (2.2 mph/s) (service); 4.5 km/(h⋅s) (2.8 mph/s) (emergency)
- Electric systems: 1,500 V DC overhead catenary
- Current collection: Pantograph
- Bogies: FS-777 (motored); FS-777T (trailer); FS-777CT (end cars)
- Braking systems: Electronically controlled pneumatic brakes with regenerative braking, pure electric braking
- Safety systems: New CS-ATC, ATO, ATC-P, T-DATC, Tobu ATS, Seibu ATS
- Coupling system: Shibata
- Track gauge: 1,067 mm (3 ft 6 in)

The Tokyo Metro 10000 series (東京メトロ10000系, Tōkyō Metoro 10000-kei) is an electric multiple unit (EMU) train type operated on the Yurakucho and Fukutoshin subway lines of Tokyo Metro in Japan since 2006.

== Design ==
The trains are manufactured by Hitachi with aluminium bodies to its "A-train" concept.

The 10000 series was the first new model to be built for the Tokyo Metro following privatization. The front-end design is intended to evoke the appearance of the 300 series trains, which were the first trains used on the Marunouchi Line.

On set numbers 10105 onward, built from 2007, the gold colour line was omitted on the front ends.

== Operations ==
- Tokyo Metro Fukutoshin Line (from June 2008)
- Tokyo Metro Yurakucho Line (from September 2006)
- Tobu Tojo Line (from September 2006)
- Seibu Yurakucho Line (from February 2007)
- Seibu Ikebukuro Line (from February 2007)
- Tokyu Toyoko Line (from September 2012)
- Minatomirai Line (from September 2012)

The fleet of 10-car sets operates on the Yurakucho and Fukutoshin lines, including inter-running services over the Tobu Tojo Line between Wakōshi Station and Shinrinkōen Station. Also, it services over the Seibu Yurakucho and Ikebukuro Lines between Kotake-mukaihara Station and Hannō Station.

The trains were designed to allow 2 intermediate cars (cars 5 and 6) to be removed easily to create 8-car sets when through-running commences from the Fukutoshin Line to the Tokyu Toyoko Line in 2013. From 7 September 2012, five sets (10101 to 10105) were reformed as 8-car sets to cover a shortage in 8-car 7000 series trainsets. These sets are identified by the addition of "8 CARS" stickers on the cab windows. They were introduced on Tokyu Toyoko Line and Minatomirai Line services, several months before the planned start of through-running operations. Once the shortage in 8-car 7000 series trainsets was over these 8-car sets were subsequently reformed back into 10-car sets.

== Formation ==
As of 1 April 2015, the fleet consists of 36 ten-car sets (numbered 01 to 36), formed as follows, with car 1 at the northern (Wakoshi) end.

| Car No. | 1 | 2 | 3 | 4 | 5 | 6 | 7 | 8 | 9 | 10 |
|---|---|---|---|---|---|---|---|---|---|---|
| Designation | CT2 | M2 | M1 | T | TC2 | MC1 | TC1 | MC2 | M1' | CT1 |
| Numbering | 10000 | 10900 | 10800 | 10700 | 10600 | 10500 | 10400 | 10300 | 10200 | 10100 |

Cars 3 and 9 each have two single-arm pantographs, while car 6 has one.

When necessary, the trains can be shortened to eight cars, formed as follows.

| Car No. | 1 | 2 | 3 | 4 | 7 | 8 | 9 | 10 |
|---|---|---|---|---|---|---|---|---|
| Designation | CT2 | M2 | M1 | T | TC1 | MC2 | M1' | CT1 |
| Numbering | 10000 | 10900 | 10800 | 10700 | 10400 | 10300 | 10200 | 10100 |

Cars 3 and 9 each have two single-arm pantographs.

== Interior ==
Passenger accommodation consists of longitudinal bench seating throughout. Priority seats are provided at the ends of each car, and cars 2 and 9 have wheelchair spaces. Car 9 is designated as a "moderately air-conditioned" car.

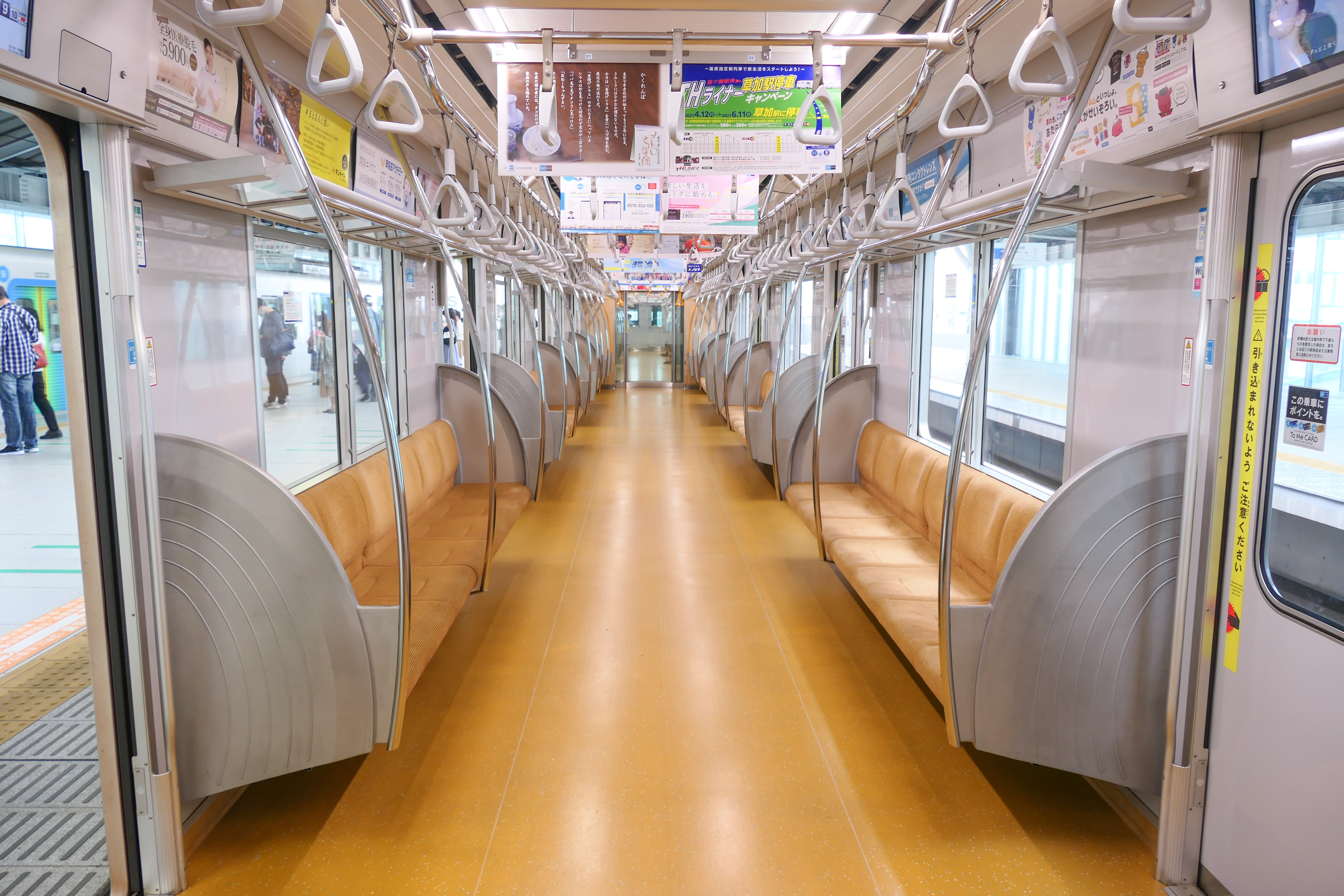
Interior view

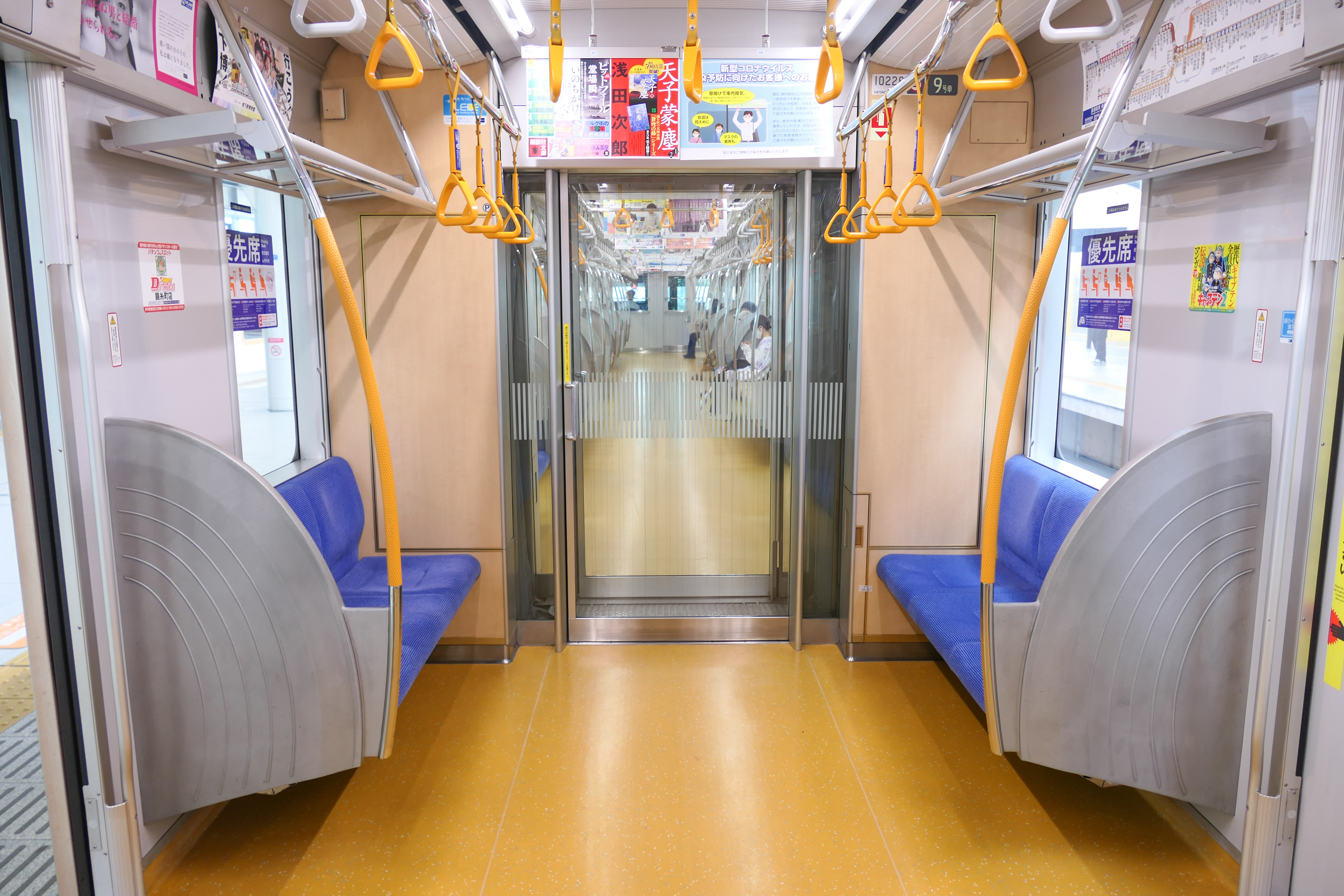
Priority seating

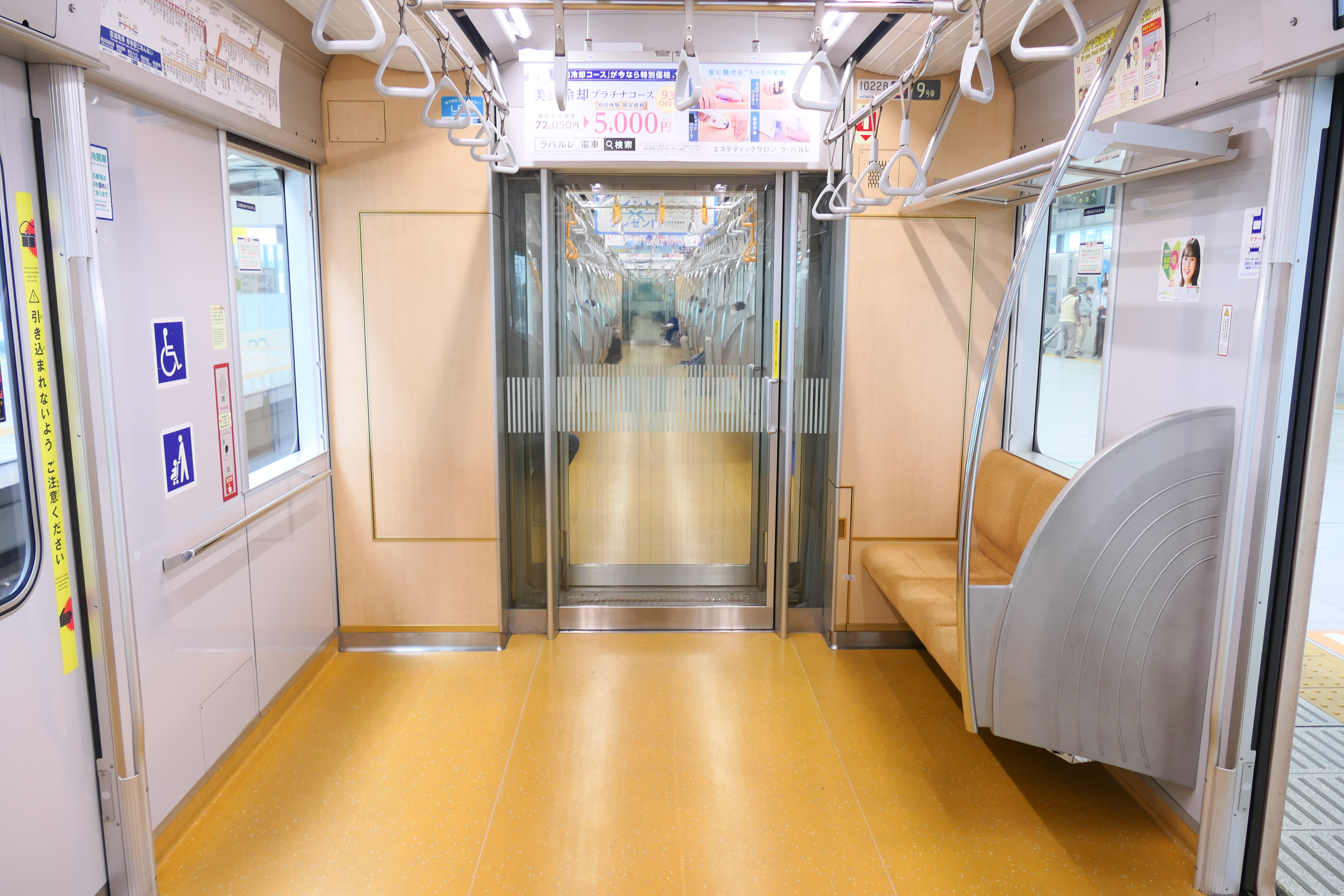
Wheelchair space

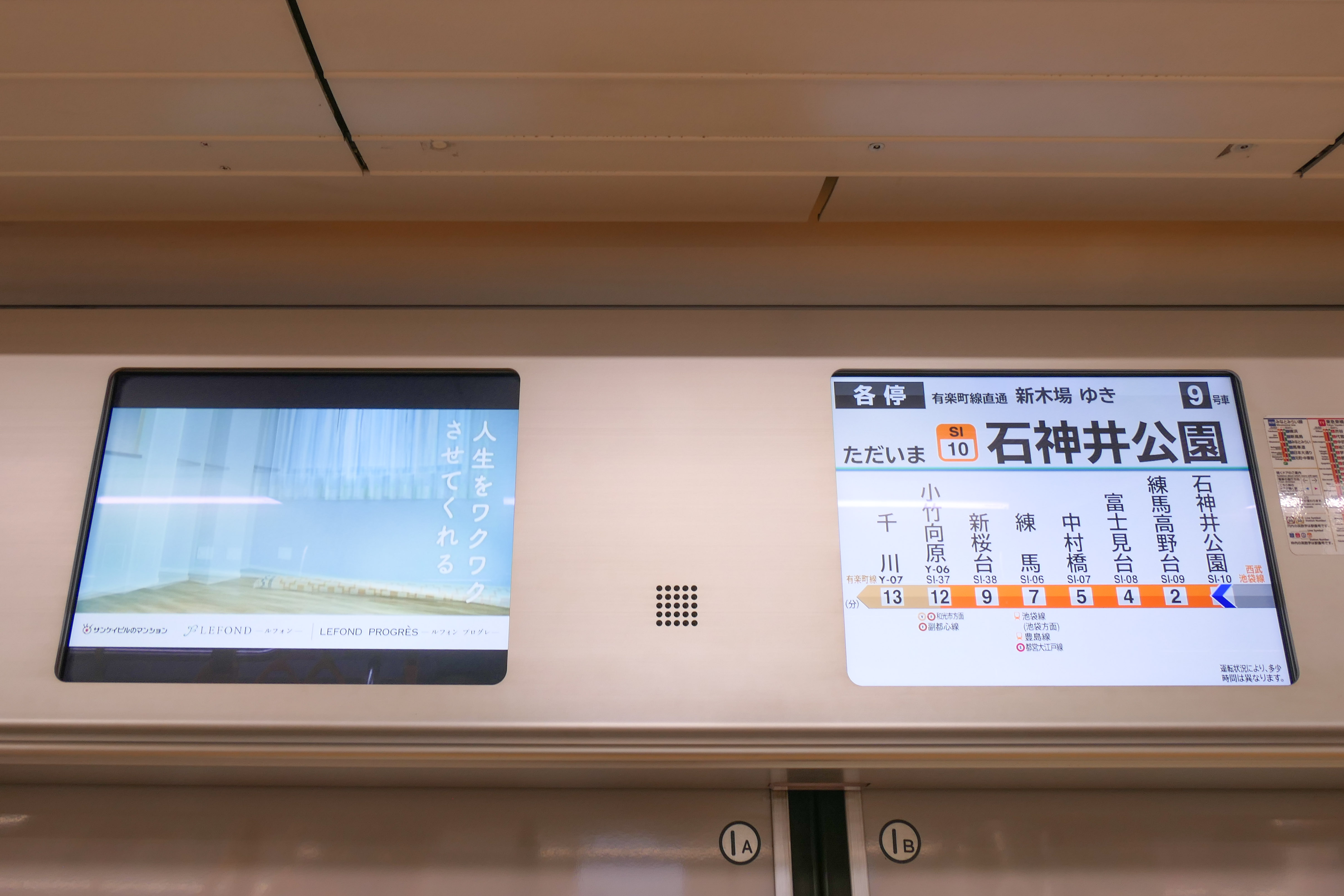
LCD passenger information display screens above doorways (before software change)

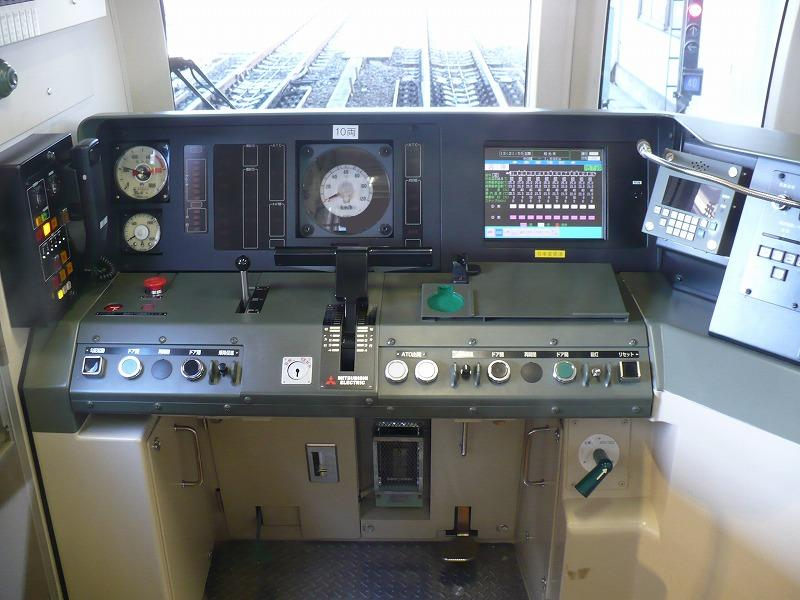
Driver's cab

== History ==
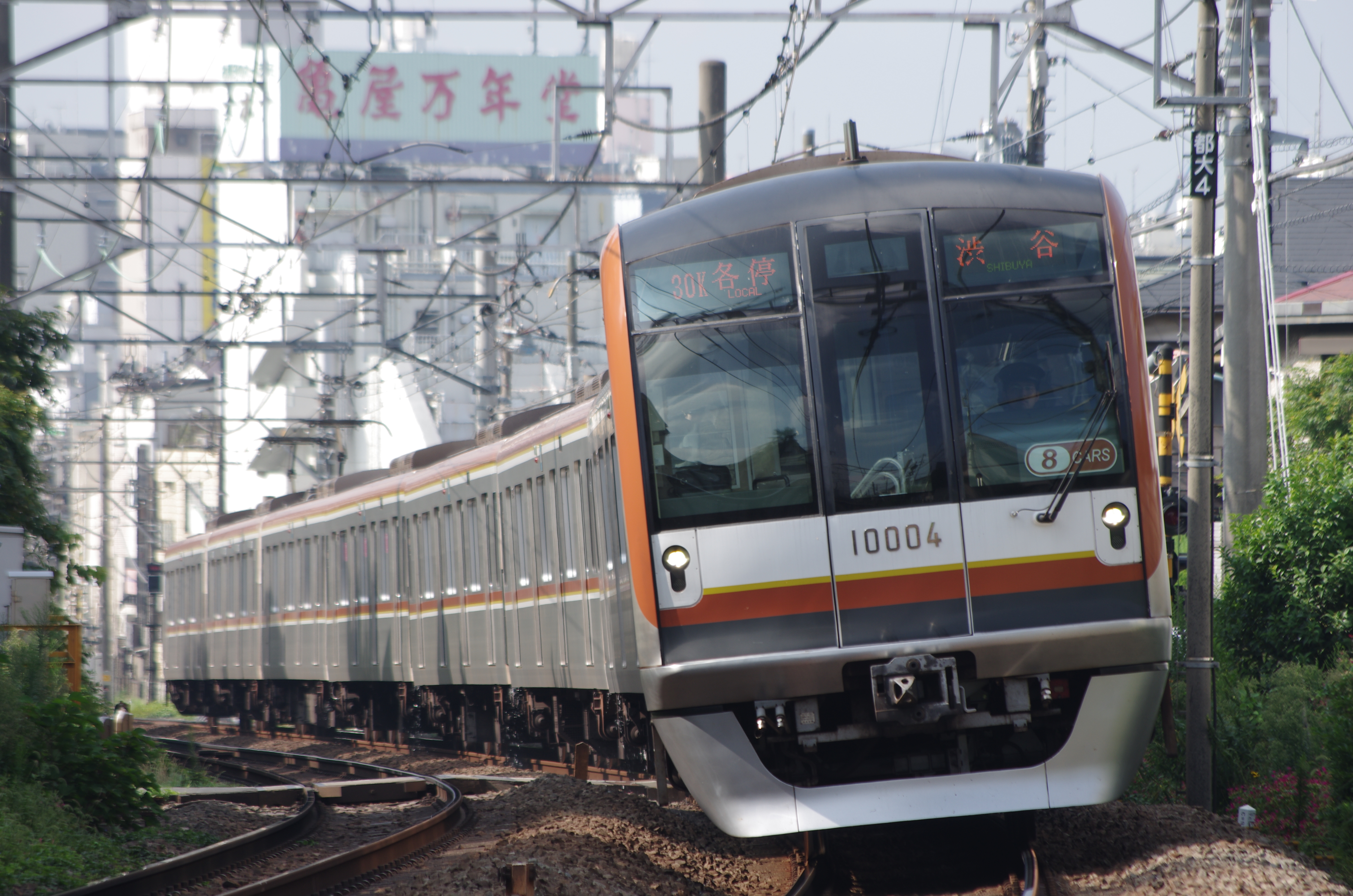
8-car set 10104 on a Tokyu Toyoko Line service September 2012

The first set was delivered in May 2006, and entered service on the Tokyo Metro Yurakucho Line and Tobu Tojo Line in September 2006, allowing four 07 series sets to be transferred to the Tozai Line to replace the remaining 5000 series sets. 10000 series sets entered service on the Seibu Line in February 2007. At the start of Fukutoshin Line services in June 2008, a total of 22 sets had been delivered. And as of 1 April 2015, the fleet consists of 36 ten-car sets.

8-car 10000 series sets entered service on the Tokyu Toyoko Line and Minatomirai Line from 7 September 2012. These 8-car sets were subsequently reformed back into 10-car sets.

From April 2016, the original three-colour LED destination indicator panels on some sets were replaced with full-colour LED indicator panels.

== Gallery ==
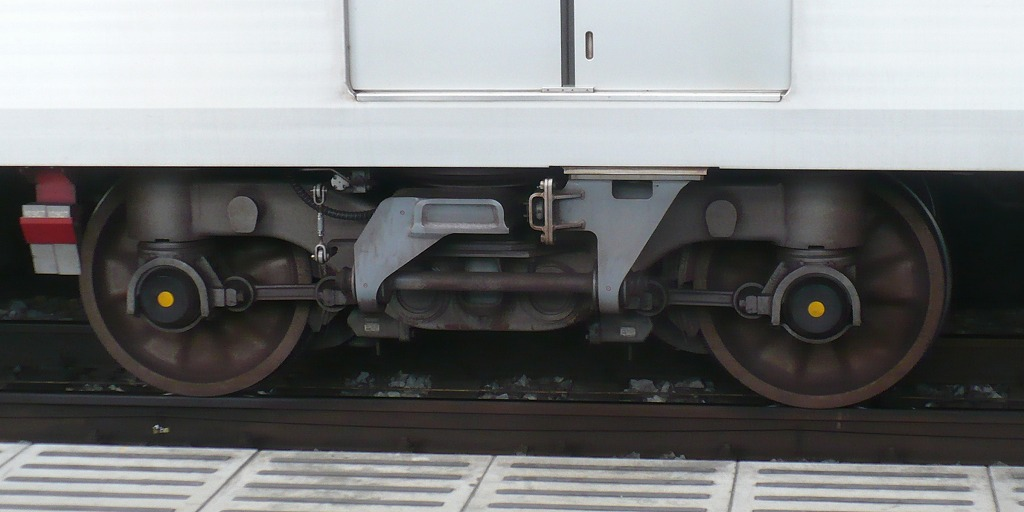
FS-777 bogie as used on the 10000 series

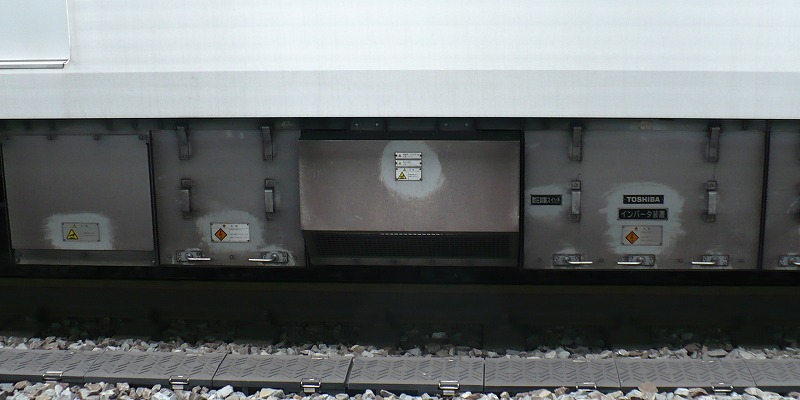
SIV equipment of the 10000 series

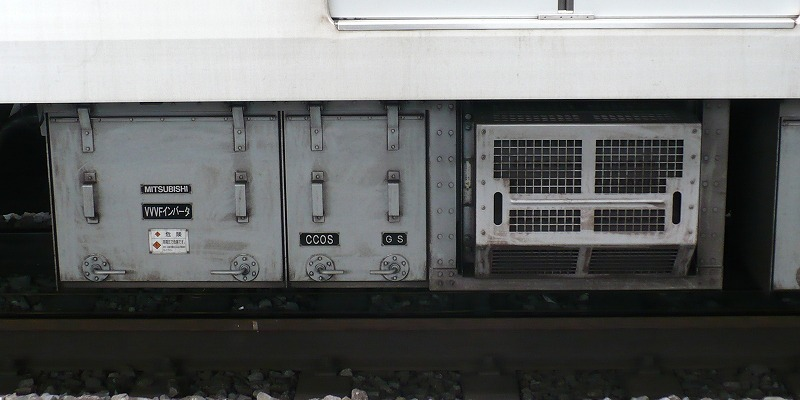
VVVF equipment as used on the 10000 series

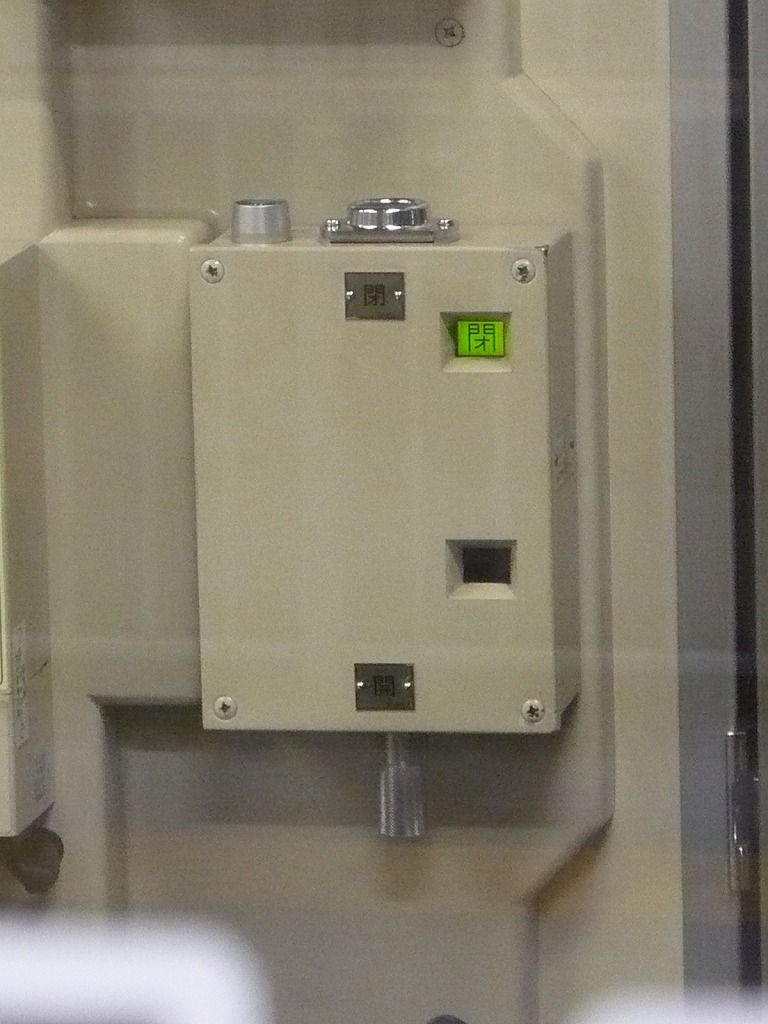
Door controls for the 10000 series

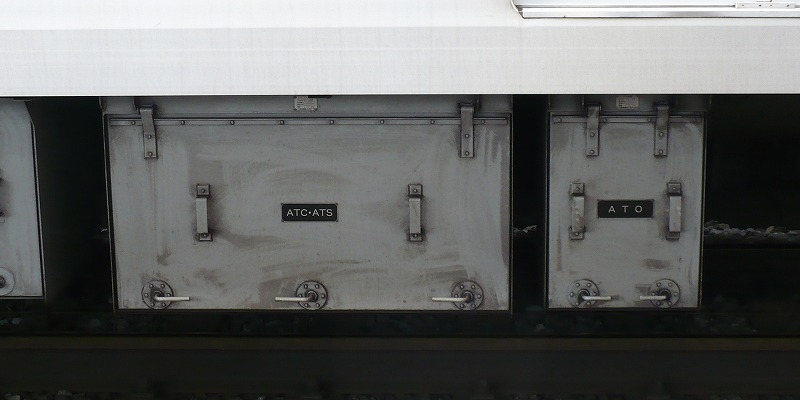
Signalling equipment of the 10000 series

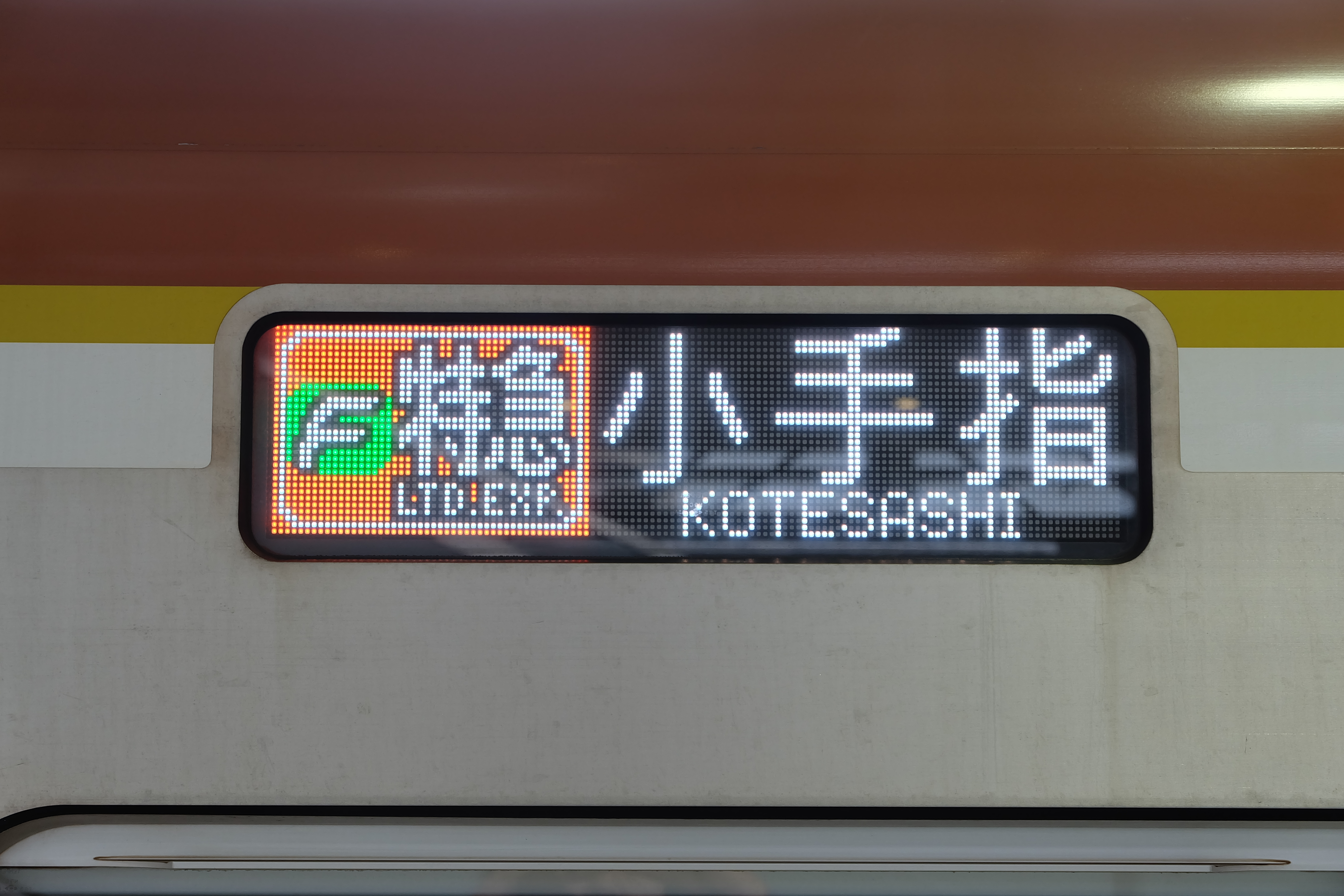
Full-colour LED side display displaying the F-Liner service and destination on the 10000 series

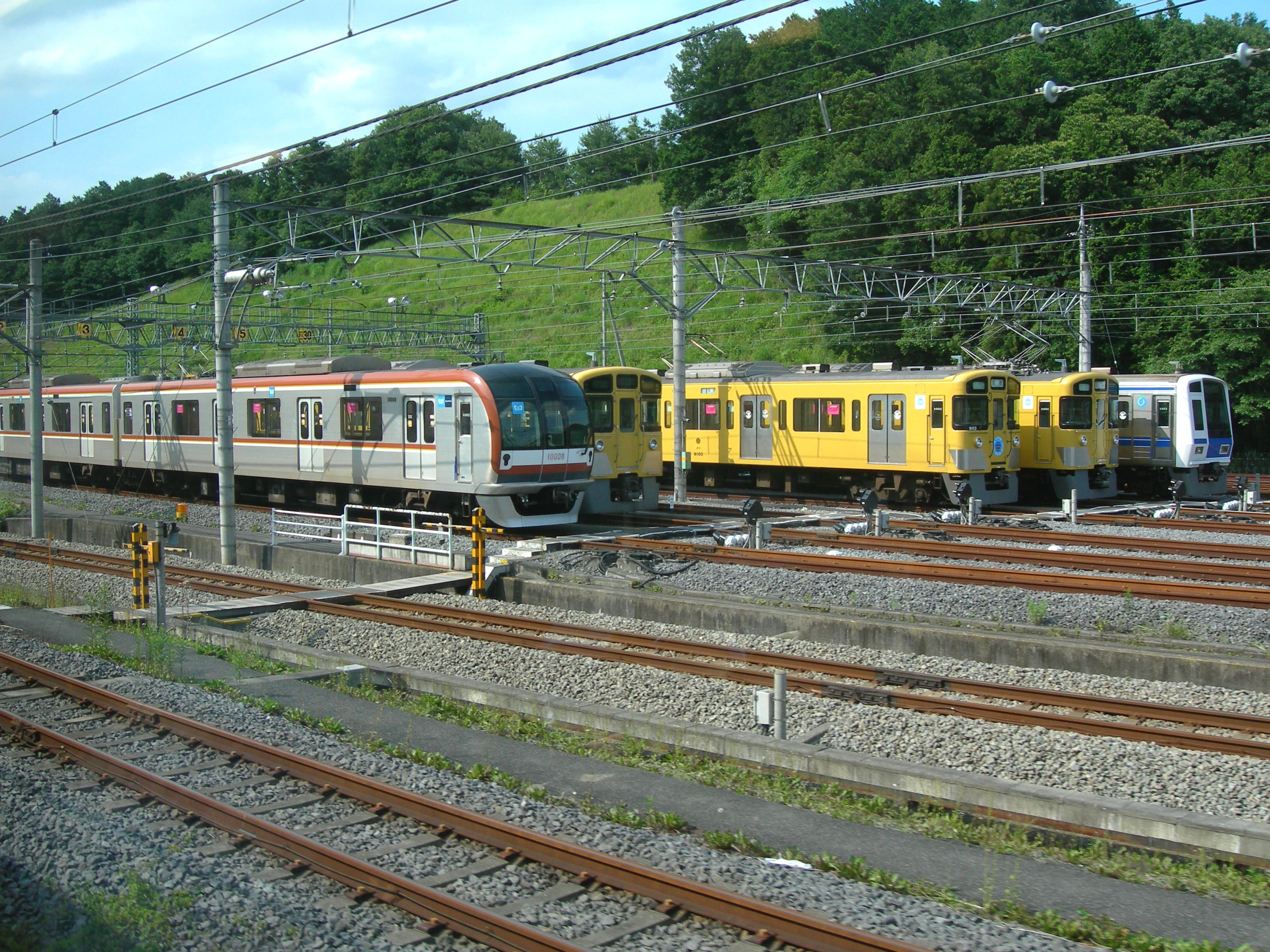
Tokyo Metro 10000 series unit at Seibu Railway's Musashigaoka Depot
