= Tokyo Metro 7000 series =

Japanese electric multiple unit train type

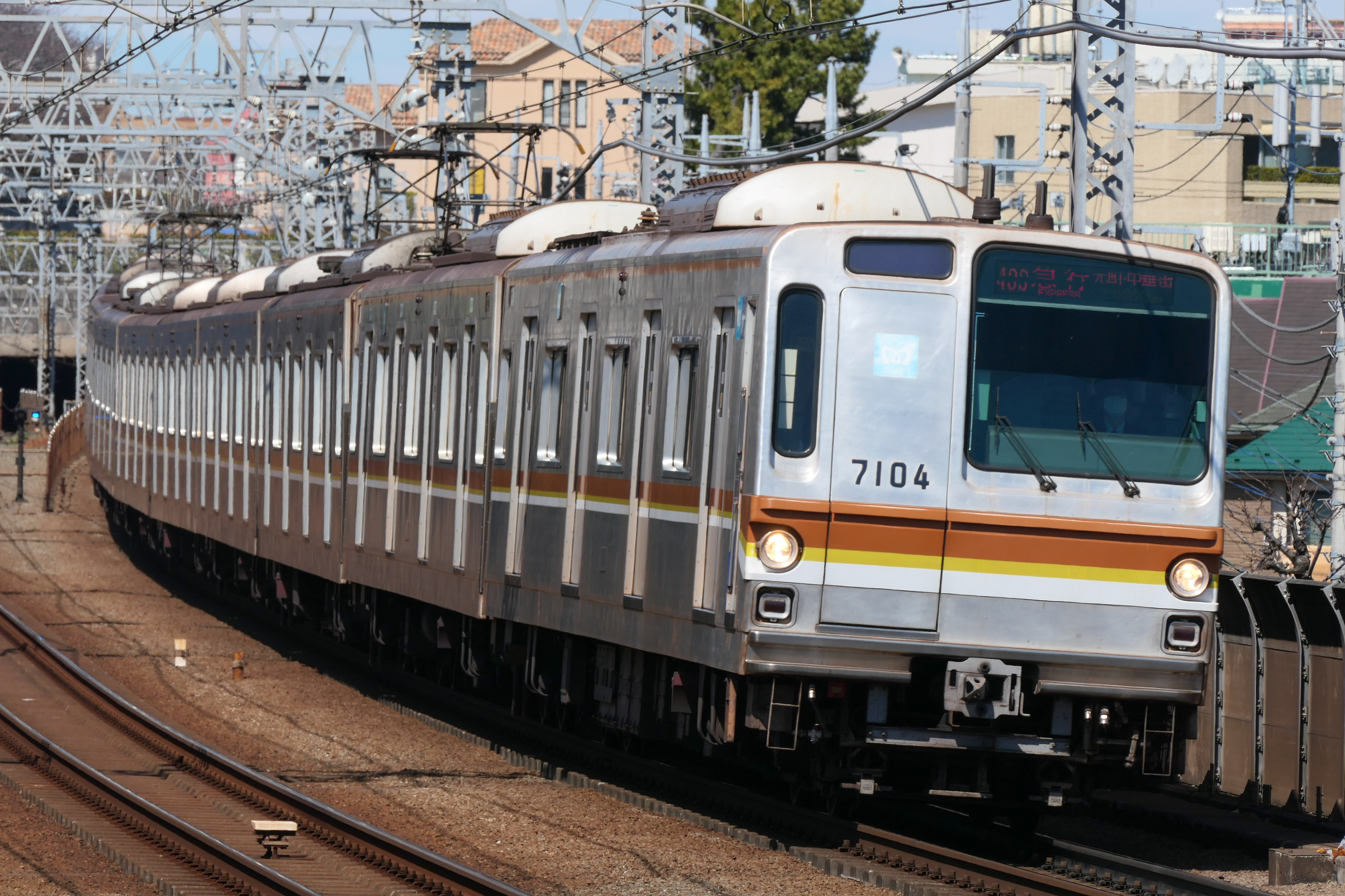
- Set 7104 on the Tokyu Toyoko Line in March 2021
- In service: 1974–2022 (Japan); 2010–present (Indonesia)
- Manufacturers: Kawasaki Heavy Industries; Kinki Sharyo; Nippon Sharyo; Tokyu Car Corporation
- Constructed: 1974–1989
- Entered service: 30 October 1974
- Refurbished: 2007–2009
- Scrapped: 2007–2009, 2021–2022
- Number built: 340 vehicles (34 10-car sets)
- Number in service: 0 vehicles (Japan); 16 vehicles (2 sets) (Indonesia)
- Number preserved: 1 vehicle (1 set) (Japan)
- Number scrapped: 138 vehicles (Japan); 16 vehicles (2 sets) (Indonesia)
- Successor: Tokyo Metro 17000 series and Tokyo Metro 10000 series (Japan); CLI-125 series and CLI-225 series (Indonesia)
- Formation: 8/10 cars per trainset (Japan) and 8 cars per trainset (Indonesia)
- Capacity: 136 (48 seating) (end cars), 144 (51/54 seating) (intermediate cars)
- Operators: Teito Rapid Transit Authority (1974–2004); Tokyo Metro (2004–2022); KAI Commuter (2011–present)
- Depots: Wakoshi (Japan) and Depok (KAIC)
- Lines served: All Retired: Japan: Tokyo Metro Yurakucho Line; Tokyo Metro Fukutoshin Line; Tobu Tojo Line; Seibu Yurakucho Line; Seibu Ikebukuro Line; Tokyu Toyoko Line; Minatomirai Line; Indonesia: KAI Commuter Bogor Line; KAI Commuter Tanjung Priok Line; KAI Commuter Loop Line (until 27 May 2022)

Specifications
- Car body construction: Aluminium
- Car length: 20 m (65 ft 7 in)
- Width: 2.8 m (9 ft 2 in)
- Height: 4.145 m (13 ft 7.2 in)
- Maximum speed: Japan: 80 km/h (50 mph) (on Yurakucho Line), 100 km/h (62 mph) (on Tobu Line); Indonesia: 70 km/h (43 mph) (on most lines)
- Traction system: Chopper control, IGBT-VVVF
- Power output: 160 kW or 165 kW, previously 150 kW
- Transmission: Westinghouse-Natal Drive; Gear ratio: 6.53 : 1
- Acceleration: 3.3 km/(h⋅s) (2.1 mph/s)
- Deceleration: 3.5 km/(h⋅s) (2.2 mph/s) (service); 4.5 km/(h⋅s) (2.8 mph/s) (emergency)
- Electric system: 1,500 V DC overhead
- Bogies: FS-388, FS-388, FS-515
- Braking system: Electronically controlled pneumatic brakes with regenerative braking
- Safety systems: New CS-ATC, ATO, ATC-P, T-DATC, Tobu ATS, Seibu ATS
- Coupling system: Shibata coupler
- Track gauge: 1,067 mm (3 ft 6 in)

The Tokyo Metro 7000 series (東京メトロ7000系, Tōkyō Metoro 7000-kei) was an electric multiple unit (EMU) train type operated by the Tokyo subway operator Tokyo Metro in Tokyo, Japan, between 1974 and 2022, and by KAI Commuter in Jakarta, Indonesia, since 2010. The design is based on the earlier Tokyo Metro 6000 series trains used on the Tokyo Metro Chiyoda Line.

== Operations ==
7000 series trainsets operated on the following lines.

=== Tokyo Metro (1974–2022) ===
- ■ Tokyo Metro Yurakucho Line (10-car sets)
- ■ Tokyo Metro Fukutoshin Line (8/10-car sets)
- ■ Tobu Tojo Line between Wakōshi and Shiki (8-car sets) or Shinrinkoen (10-car sets)
- ■ Seibu Yurakucho Line
- ■ Seibu Ikebukuro Line between Kotake-Mukaihara and Hannō
- ■ Tokyu Toyoko Line (from 28 September 2012)
- ■ Minatomirai Line (from 28 September 2012)

=== KAI Commuter (2010–2025) ===
- KAI Commuter Bogor Line

== Formations ==
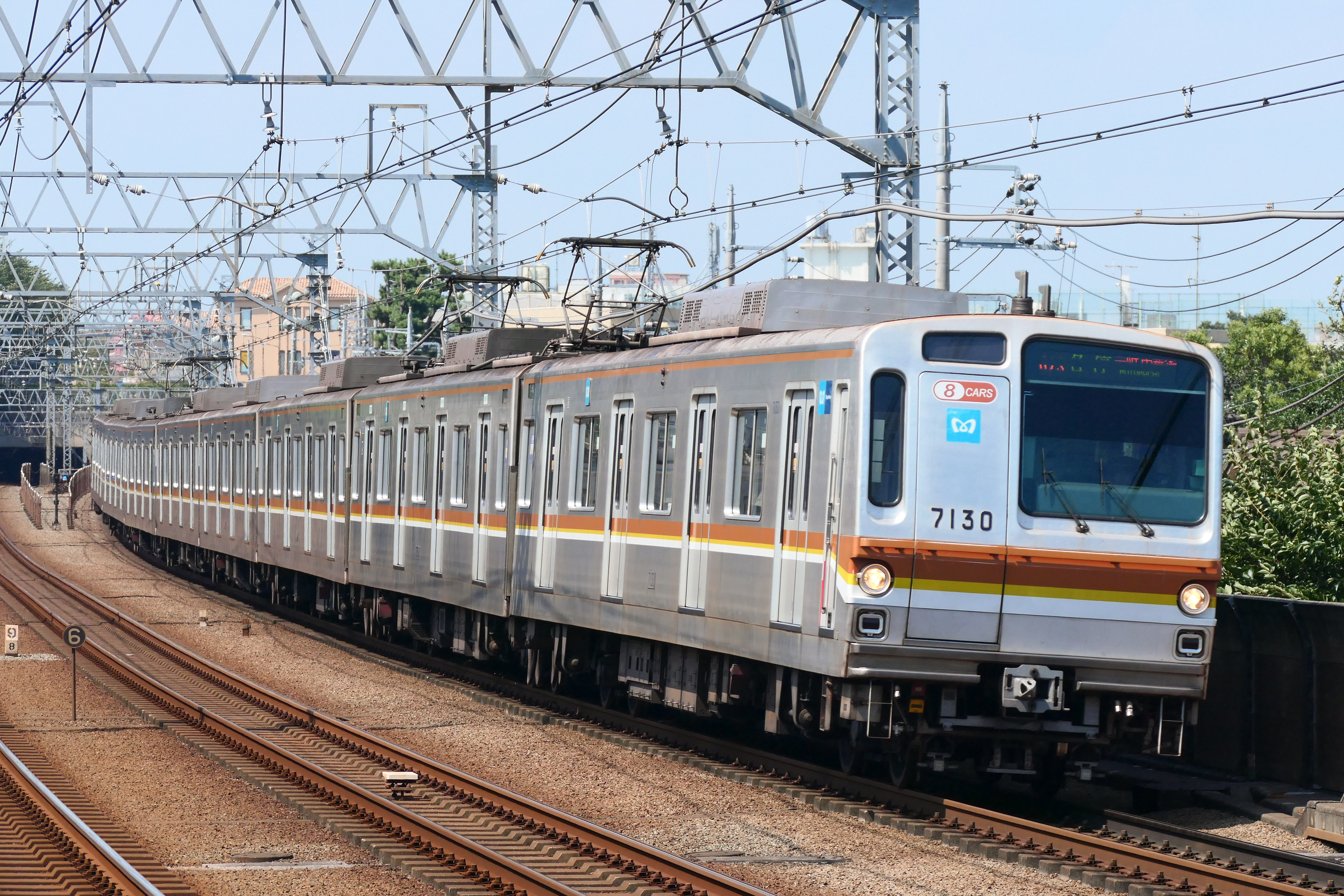
8-car set 7130 on the Tokyu Toyoko Line in August 2019

As of 1 April 2017, the fleet consists of six ten-car sets and 15 eight-car sets, formed as shown below with car 1 at the northern end.

=== 10-car sets ===
| Car No. | 1 | 2 | 3 | 4 | 5 | 6 | 7 | 8 | 9 | 10 |
|---|---|---|---|---|---|---|---|---|---|---|
| Designation | CT2 | M1 | M2 | M1 | Tc2 | Tc1 | M2' | M1 | T2 | CT1 |
| Numbering | 7000 | 7900 | 7800 | 7700 | 7600 | 7500 | 7400 | 7300 | 7200 | 7100 |

only 7102F

| Car No. | 1 | 2 | 3 | 4 | 5 | 6 | 7 | 8 | 9 | 10 |
|---|---|---|---|---|---|---|---|---|---|---|
| Designation | CM2 | M1 | T2 | Tc2 | M2 | M1 | Tc1 | M2' | M1 | CT1 |
| Numbering | 7002 | 7902 | 7202 | 7602 | 7802 | 7702 | 7502 | 7402 | 7302 | 7102 |

- Cars 2, 4, and 8 are each fitted with two lozenge-type pantographs.
- Car 9 is designated as a moderately air-conditioned car.

=== 8-car sets ===
| Car No. | 1 | 2 | 3 | 4 | 5 | 6 | 7 | 8 |
|---|---|---|---|---|---|---|---|---|
| Designation | CT2 | M2 | M1 | Tc2 | Tc1 | M2 | M1 | CT1 |
| Numbering | 7000 | 7800 | 7900 | 7200 | 7500 | 7400 | 7300 | 7100 |

- Cars 3 and 7 are each fitted with two lozenge-type pantographs.
- Car 7 is designated as a moderately air-conditioned car.

== Interior ==
Passenger accommodation consists of longitudinal bench seating throughout. Cars 2 and 9 in the ten-car sets and cars 2 and 7 in the eight-car sets each have a wheelchair space. Priority seating is provided at the end of each car.

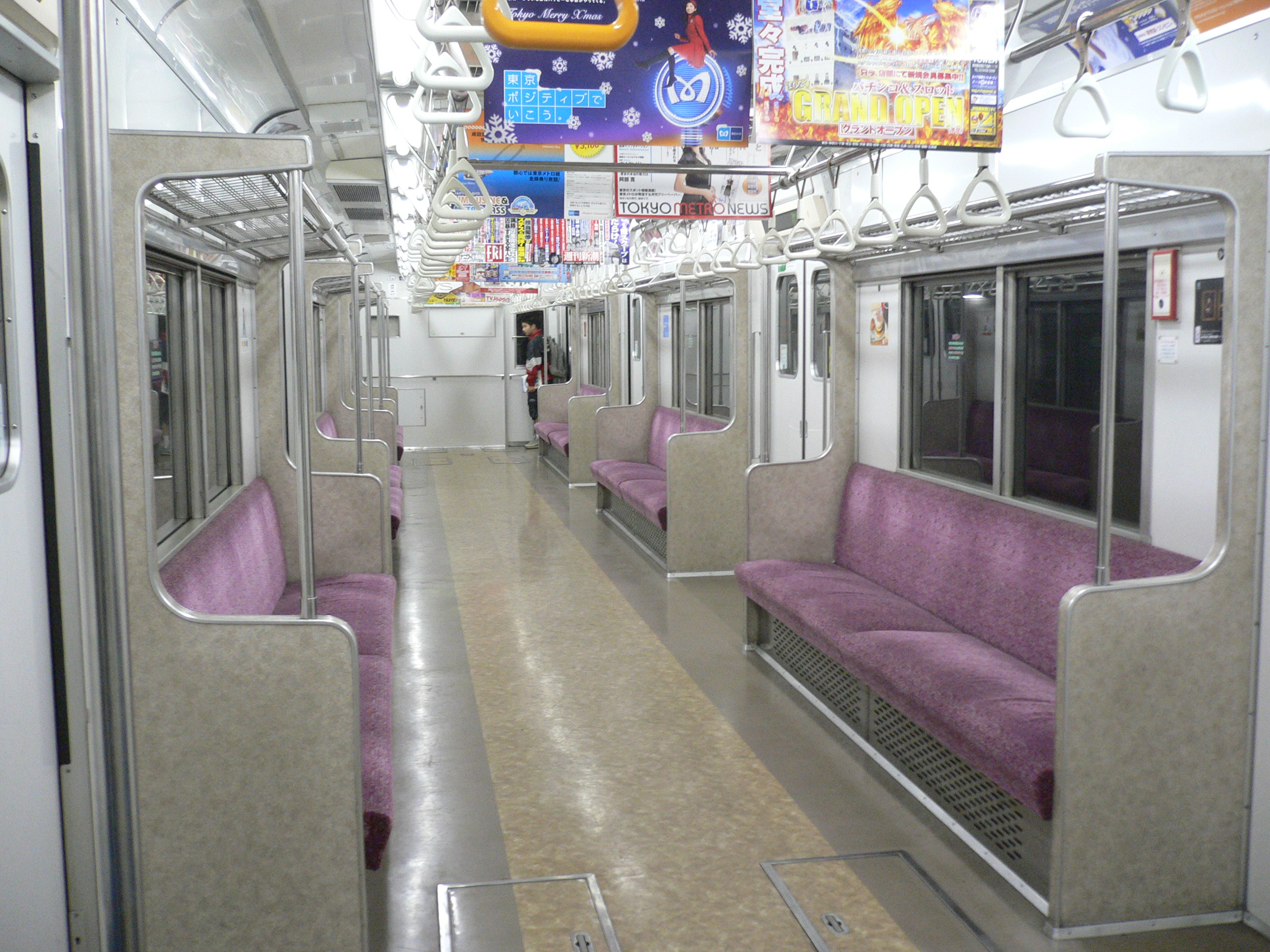
Interior of set 7105 which has received type B refurbishment

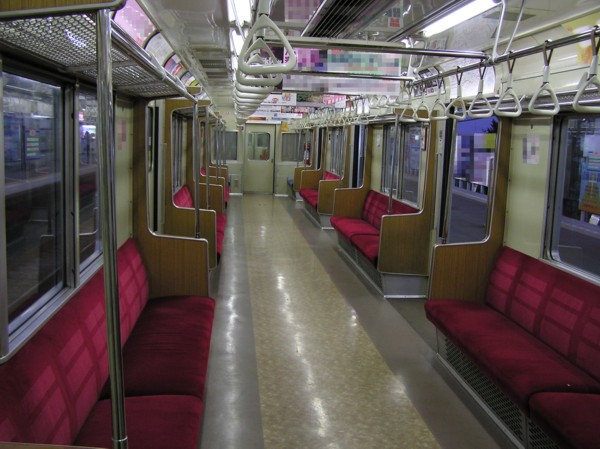
Interior of set 7126

== History ==
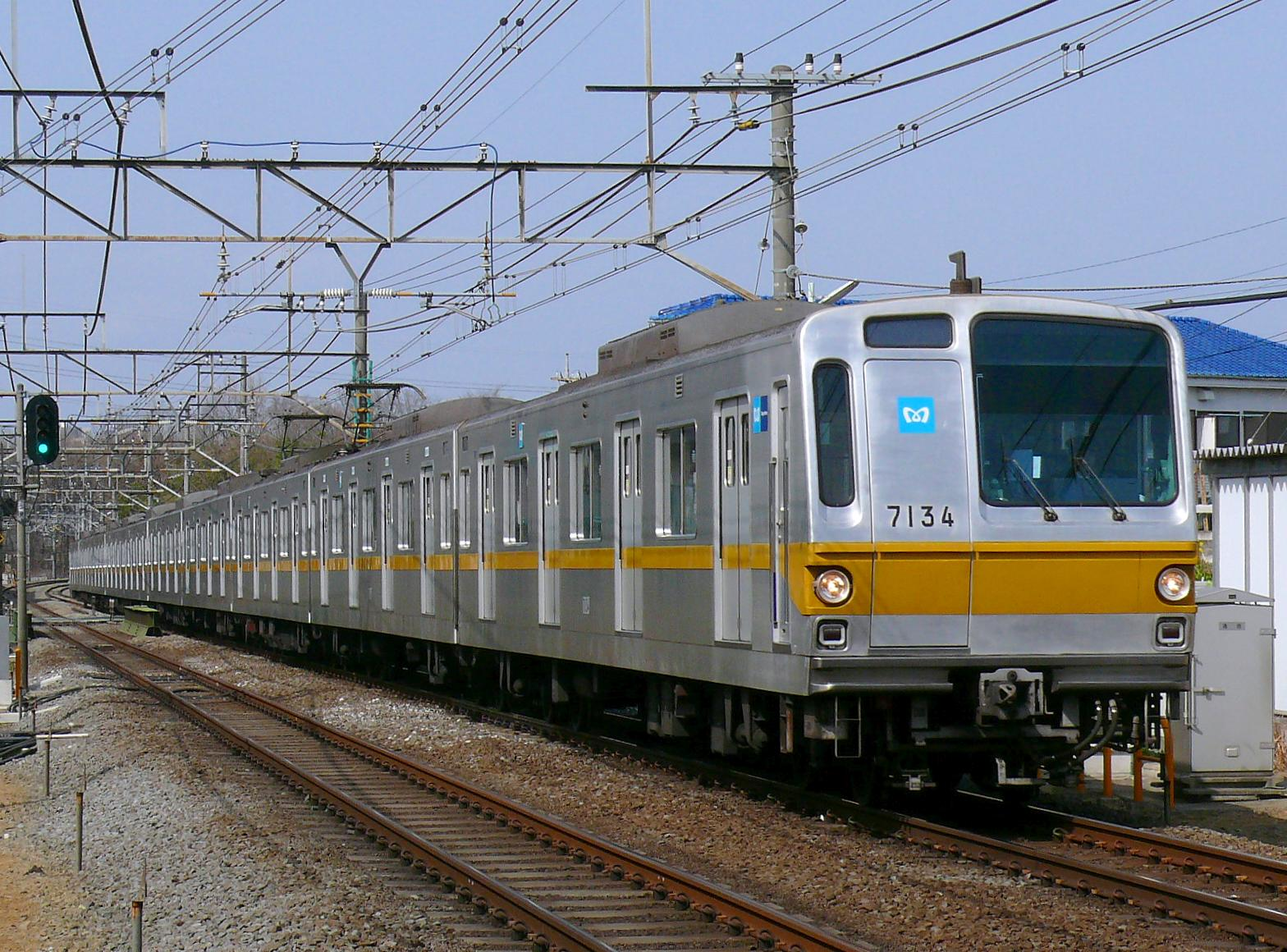
7000 series set 7134 in original Yurakucho Line livery on the Seibu Ikebukuro Line in March 2008

The 7000 series was introduced into service on 30 October 1974, when the Yurakucho Line first opened. Its design is derived from that of the 6000 series developed for the Chiyoda Line. They were initially formed as five-car sets, but after the Yurakucho Line was extended to Chikatetsu-narimasu in 1983, the 7000 series sets were formed as ten-car sets. By 1989, 340 vehicles were built, which were formed into 34 ten-car sets.

=== Refurbishment ===
Between 2007 and 2009, the 7000 series fleet was refurbished coinciding with use on Fukutoshin Line services. The sets were fitted with new driver's cabs, CCTV equipment, updated traction and braking systems, automatic train operation, and other miscellaneous technical improvements. Some sets were also shortened to eight cars. The sets were also reliveried with brown, gold, and white stripes coinciding with use on Fukutoshin Line services. They originally sported a yellow bodyside line when used primarily on Yurakucho Line services.

=== Withdrawal ===
After the refurbishment programme, a significant portion of the 7000 series fleet was withdrawn; four of these sets were shipped to Indonesia in 2010.

In 2020, Tokyo Metro unveiled the 17000 series, which replaced the remaining 7000 series sets by April 2022.

As of September 2023, ten-car set 7101 is preserved at Shin-Kiba Depot. However, in November 2025, cars 7201 to 7001 were scrapped due to their poor conditions. As a result, only car 7101 was preserved.

== Overseas operations ==
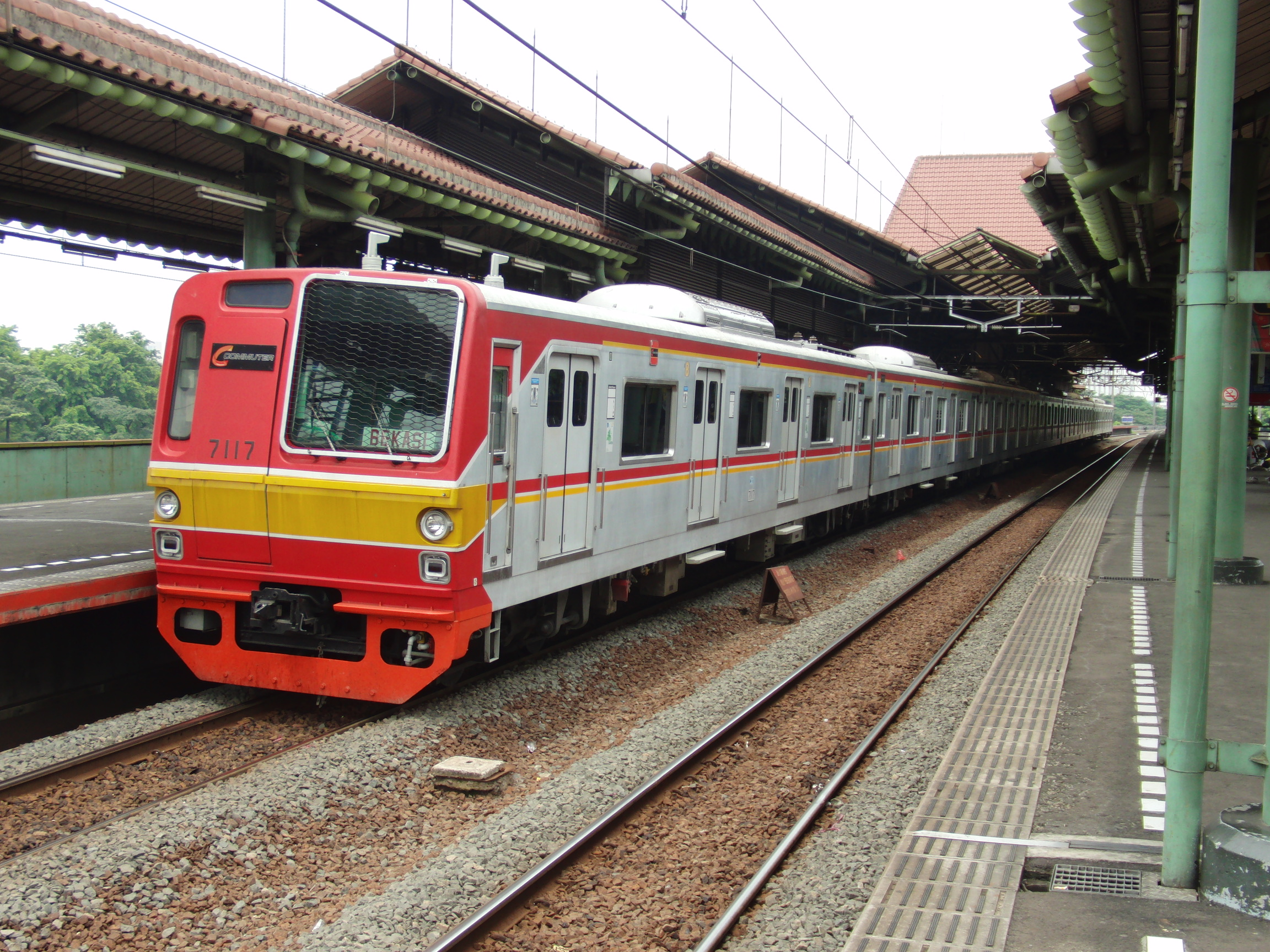
A 7000 series set 7117 operated in Jakarta, Indonesia

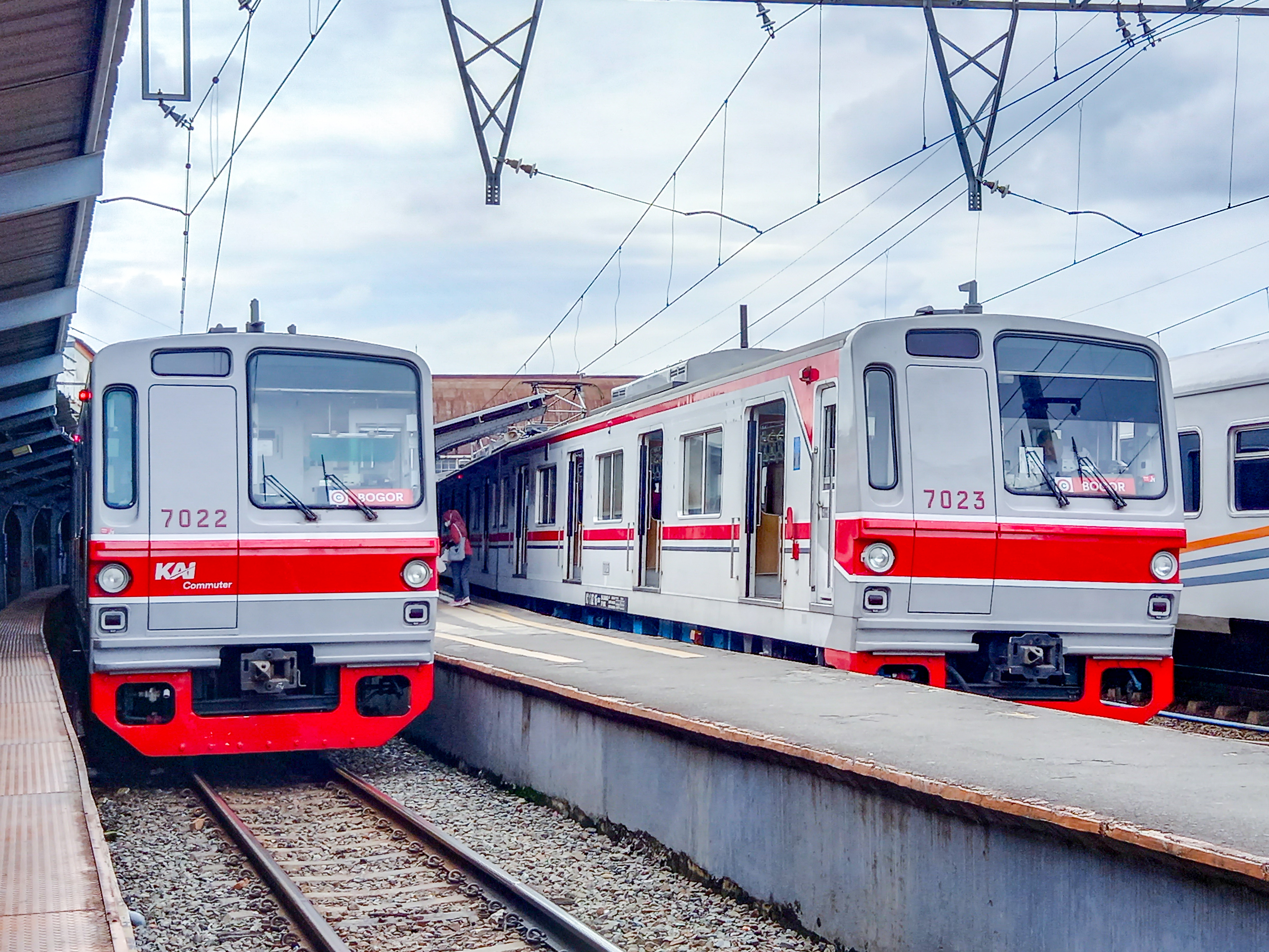
Set 7122 and 7123 at Jakarta Kota Station.

Four 7000 series ten-car sets (7117, 7121, 7122, and 7123) were shipped to Indonesia in 2010 for use on suburban services operated by KAI Commuter (formerly "KA Commuter Jabodetabek" or "KRL Jabodetabek") in Jakarta. The four sets were reduced to eight-car formations and are formed as follows, based at Depok Depot.

| 7100 (CT1) | 7200 (T2) | 7300 (M1) | 7400 (M2') | 7500 (Tc1) | 7600 (Tc2) | 7900 (M1) | 7000 (CM2) |
|---|---|---|---|---|---|---|---|
| 7117 | 7217 | 7317 | 7417 | 7517 | 7617 | 7917 | 7017 |
| 7121 | 7221 | 7321 | 7421 | 7521 | 7621 | 7921 | 7021 |
| 7122 | 7222 | 7322 | 7422 | 7522 | 7622 | 7922 | 7022 |
| 7123 | 7223 | 7323 | 7423 | 7523 | 7623 | 7923 | 7023 |

The two M1 cars in each set are equipped with two pantographs.

== Accidents and incidents ==
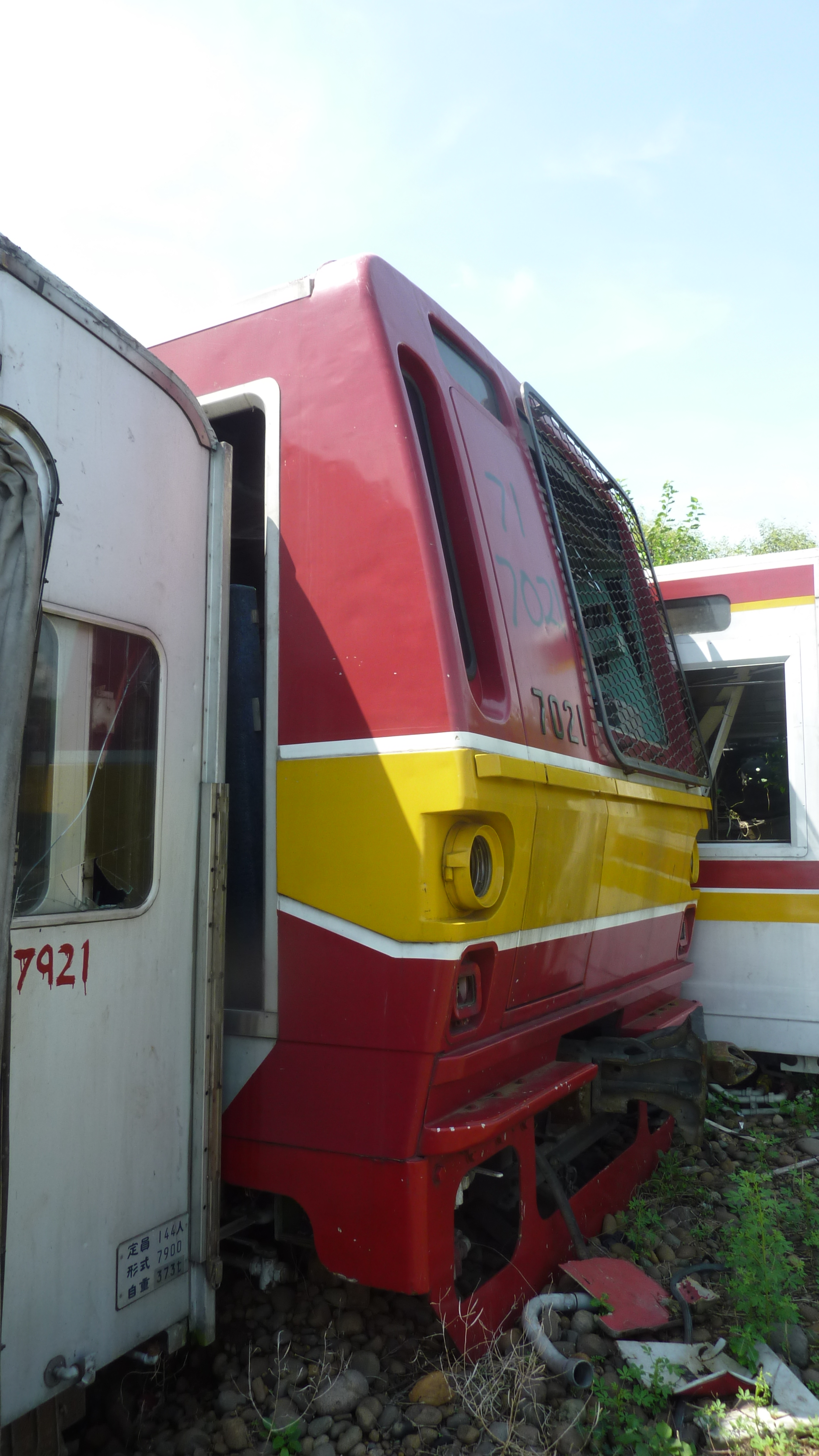
Set 7021 in Cikaum Station. This set is no longer in operation due to damage from colliding with a Pertamina fuel truck, known as the 2013 Bintaro train crash.

2013 Bintaro train crash: On 9 December 2013, set 7121 (KRL 1131) collided with a Pertamina fuel truck at a level crossing at the Bintaro Permai intersection on the Rangkasbitung Line near Bintaro, South Tangerang, Indonesia, leading to 7 deaths and 45 injuries. The front two carriages of set 7121 as well as the tank truck were both destroyed in the ensuing fire. Set 7121 was retired and scrapped in December 2014.
