= Shin-Sakuradai Station =

Railway station in Tokyo, Japan

Coordinates: 35°44′28.4″N 139°40′8.11″E

SI38 Shin-Sakuradai Station 新桜台駅
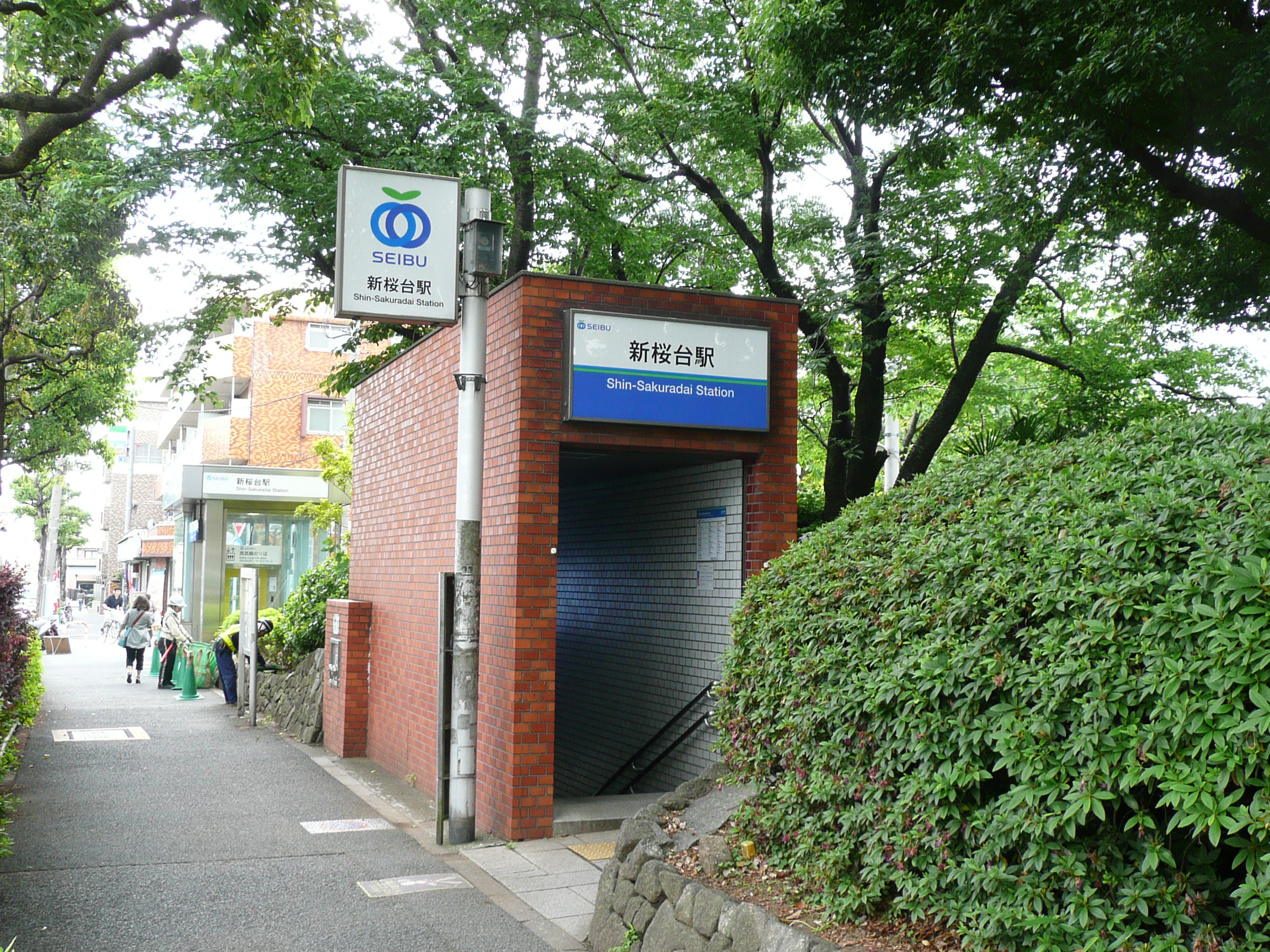
- Station entrance in May 2012

General information
- Location: 1-28-11 Sakuradai, Nerima-ku, Tokyo 176-0002; Japan
- Operator: Seibu Railway
- Line: Seibu Yurakucho Line
- Distance: 1.4 km from Nerima
- Platforms: 2 side platforms
- Tracks: 2

Construction
- Structure type: Underground

Other information
- Station code: SI38

History
- Opened: 1 October 1983

Passengers
- FY2013: 7,365 daily

Services
Preceding station	Seibu Railway	Following station
Nerima SI06 Terminus	Seibu Yūrakuchō Line Rapid Semi Express Local	Kotake-mukaihara SI37 Terminus
Location
- Location within Special wards of Tokyo Location within Tokyo Location within Japan

Shin-Sakuradai Station (新桜台駅, Shin-Sakuradai-eki) is a railway station on the Seibu Yurakucho Line in Nerima, Tokyo, Japan, operated by the private railway operator Seibu Railway.

== Lines ==
Shin-Sakuradai Station is served by the Seibu Yurakucho Line, with through trains running to and from the Seibu Ikebukuro Line to the west and the Tokyo Metro Yurakucho Line to the east. It is located 1.4 km from Nerima Station. All trains stop at this station except Rapid Express and S-Train reserved-seat trains.

== Station layout ==
Shin-Sakuradai Station is the only underground station owned by Seibu (Kotake-Mukaihara is owned by Tokyo Metro), and consists of two side platforms serving two tracks. The station concourse is located on the first basement ("B1F") level, and the platforms and tracks are located on the second basement ("B2F") level.

=== Platforms ===
1	Seibu Yurakucho Line	for Kotake-mukaihara; Tokyo Metro Yurakucho Line for Shin-Kiba; Tokyo Metro Fukutoshin Line for Shibuya; Tōkyū Tōyoko Line for Yokohama; Minatomirai Line for Motomachi-Chukagai
2	Seibu Yurakucho Line	for Nerima; Seibu Ikebukuro Line for Hannō

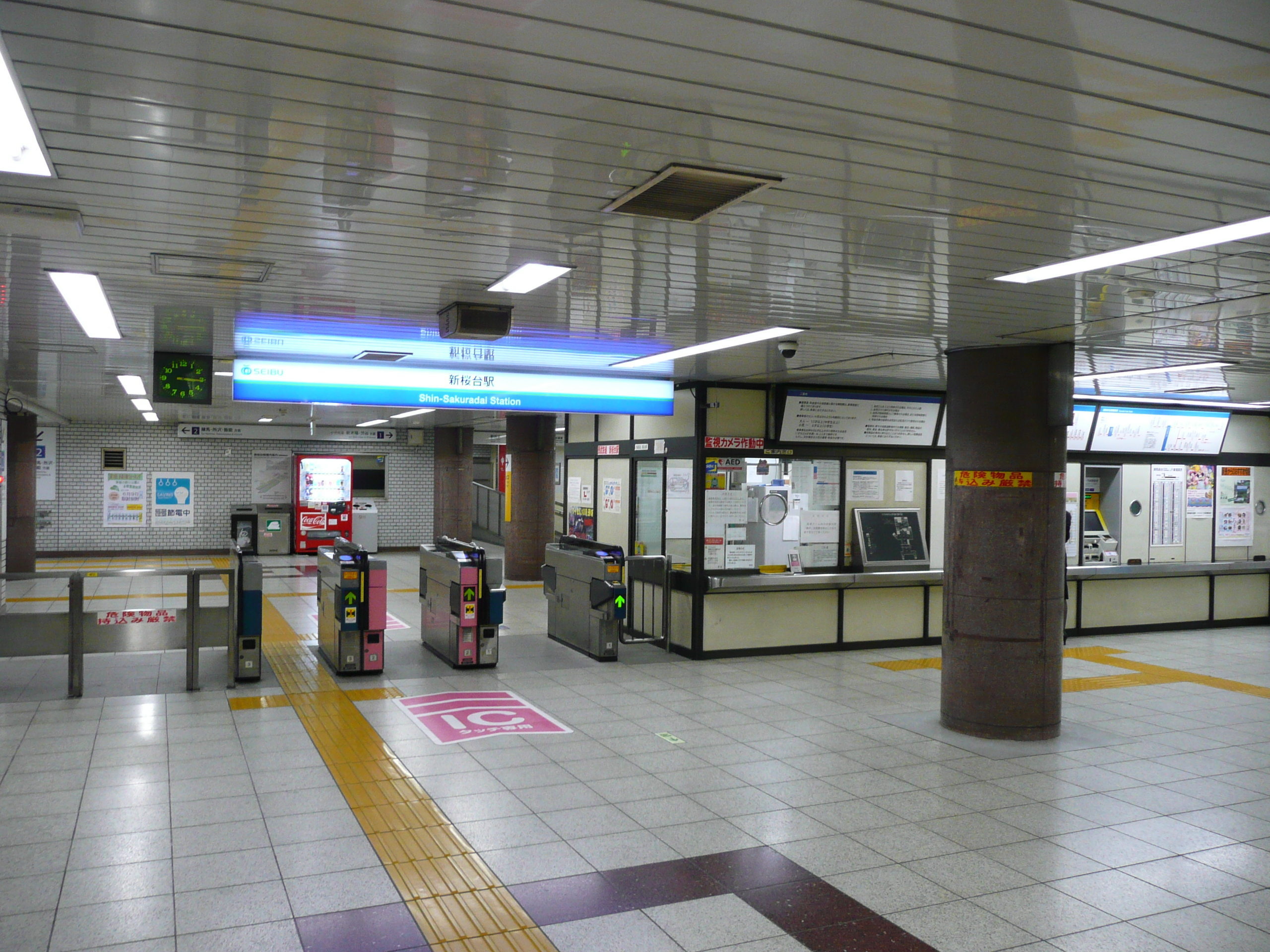
Underground concourse and ticket barriers in May 2012

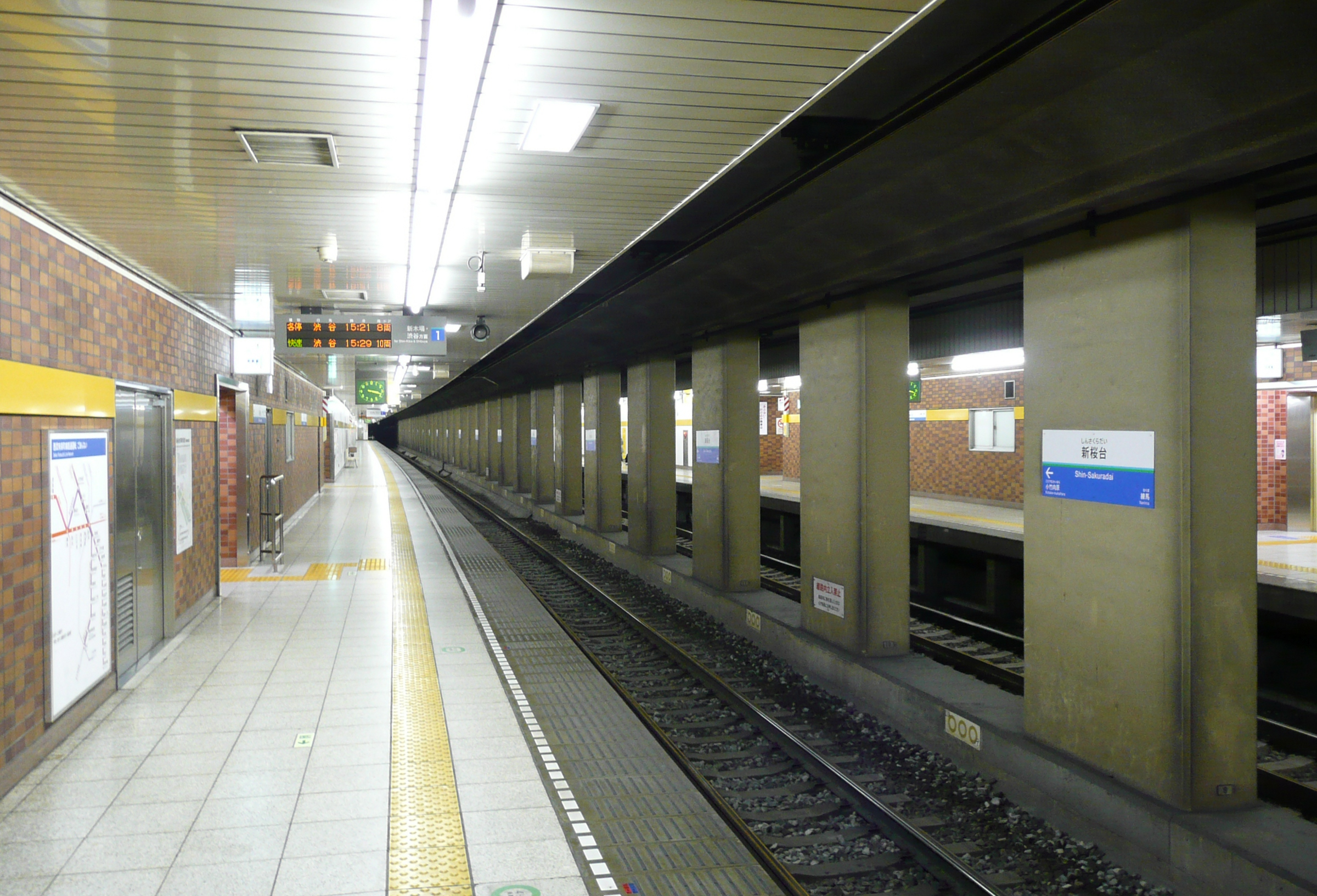
The underground platforms in May 2012

== History ==
Shin-Sakuradai Station opened on 1 October 1983.

Through services to and from the Tokyo Metro Fukutoshin Line began in 2008.

Station numbering was introduced on all Seibu Railway lines during fiscal 2012, with Shin-Sakuradai Station becoming "SI38".

Rapid Express trains began stopping at this station from 16 March 2013, when through service operation on the Seibu Ikebukuro Line system was extended to Motomachi-Chūkagai Station on the Minatomirai Line. F Liner trains (the only Rapid Express trains serving the Seibu Yūrakuchō Line) do not stop this station since 14 March 2020.

== Passenger statistics ==
In fiscal 2013, the station was the 73rd busiest on the Seibu network with an average of 7,365 passengers daily.

The passenger figures for previous years are as shown below.

Fiscal year	Daily average
2000	5,085
2009	6,378
2010	6,398
2011	6,407
2012	6,663
2013	7,365

== See also ==
- List of railway stations in Japan
