= Seibu Yūrakuchō Line =

Railway line in Japan

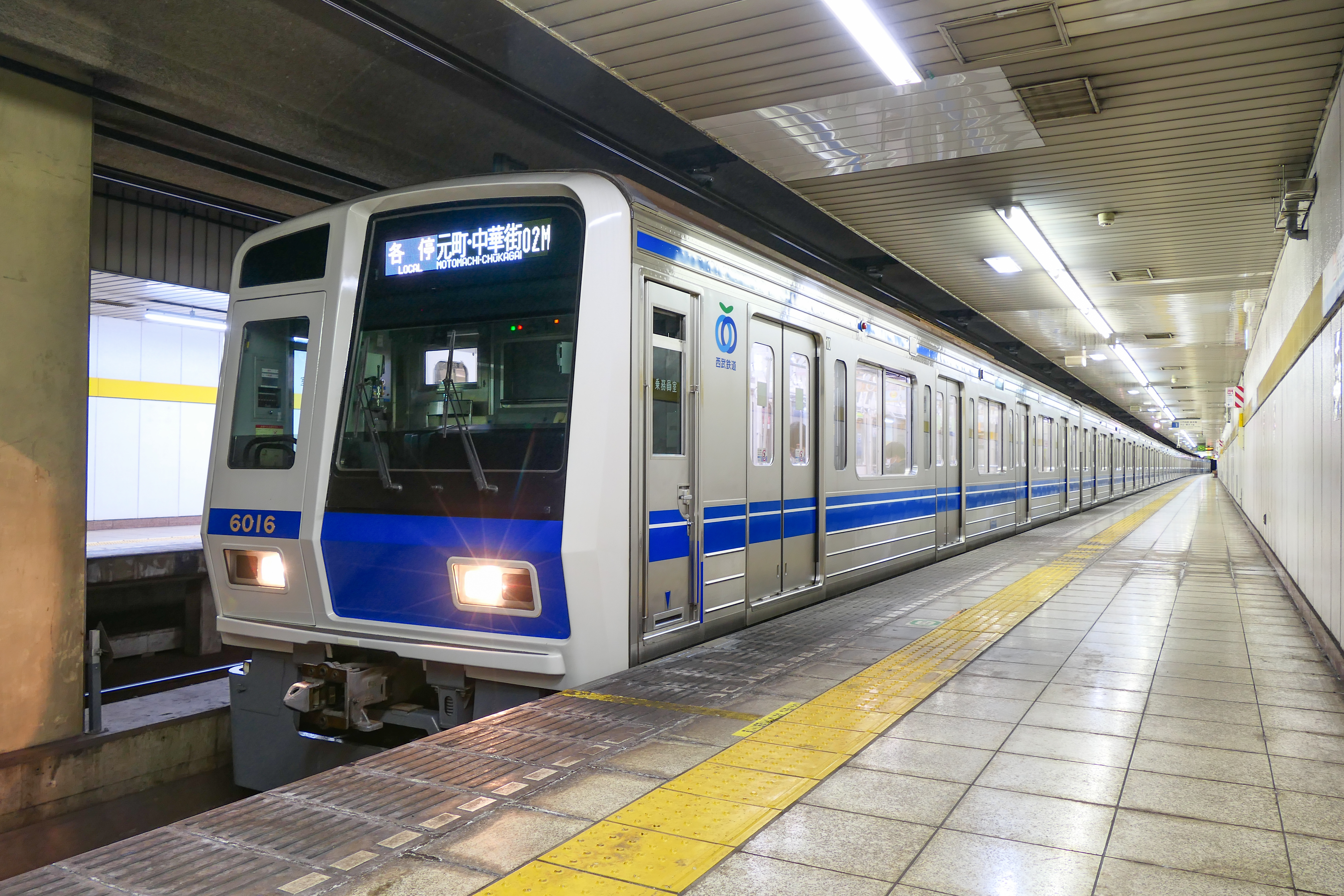
- Seibu 6000 series at Shin-Sakuradai Station, October 2022

Overview
- Native name: 西武有楽町線
- Status: In service
- Owner: Seibu Railway Co., Ltd.
- Locale: Nerima, Tokyo
- Termini: Nerima; Kotake-Mukaihara
- Stations: 3

Service
- Type: Commuter rail
- System: Seibu Railway
- Route number: SI
- Operator(s): Seibu Railway Co., Ltd.

History
- Opened: October 1, 1983; 42 years ago

Technical
- Line length: 2.6 km (1.6 mi)
- Number of tracks: 2
- Track gauge: 1,067 mm (3 ft 6 in)
- Electrification: 1,500 V DC, overhead catenary

The Seibu Yūrakuchō Line (西武有楽町線, Seibu Yūrakuchō-sen) is an underground railway line operated by the private railway operator Seibu Railway in Japan. The line links the Ikebukuro Line at Nerima Station with the Tokyo Metro's Yūrakuchō Line and Fukutoshin Line at Kotake-Mukaihara Station in Nerima, Tokyo.

== Stations ==
All stations are in Nerima, Tokyo.

| No. | Station | Japanese | Distance (km) | Semi-Express | Rapid | Rapid Express/F Liner | S-Train | Transfers |
|---|---|---|---|---|---|---|---|---|
Through service to/from Hannō via the Ikebukuro Line and Seibu-Chichibu via the Seibu Chichibu Line
| SI06 | Nerima | 練馬 | 0.0 | O | O | O | | | Ikebukuro Line (SI06; through service); Toshima Line (SI06); Ōedo Line (E-35) |
| SI38 | Shin-Sakuradai | 新桜台 | 1.4 | O | O | | | | | |
| SI37 | Kotake-Mukaihara | 小竹向原 | 2.6 | O | O | O | | | Yūrakuchō Line (Y-06); Fukutoshin Line (F-06) |
Through service to/from Shin-Kiba via the Yūrakuchō Line; To/from Motomachi-Chūkagai via the Fukutoshin Line, Tōyoko Line, and Minatomirai Line

== Rolling stock ==
=== Seibu trains ===
- Seibu 6000 series
- Seibu 40000 series
- Seibu 40050 series

=== Tokyo Metro trains ===
- Tokyo Metro 10000 series
- Tokyo Metro 17000 series

=== Tokyu trains ===
- Tokyu 5000 series
- Tokyu 5050 series
- Tokyu 5050-4000 series (since 10 September 2012)

=== Yokohama Minatomirai Railway trains ===
- Yokohama Minatomirai Railway Y500 series

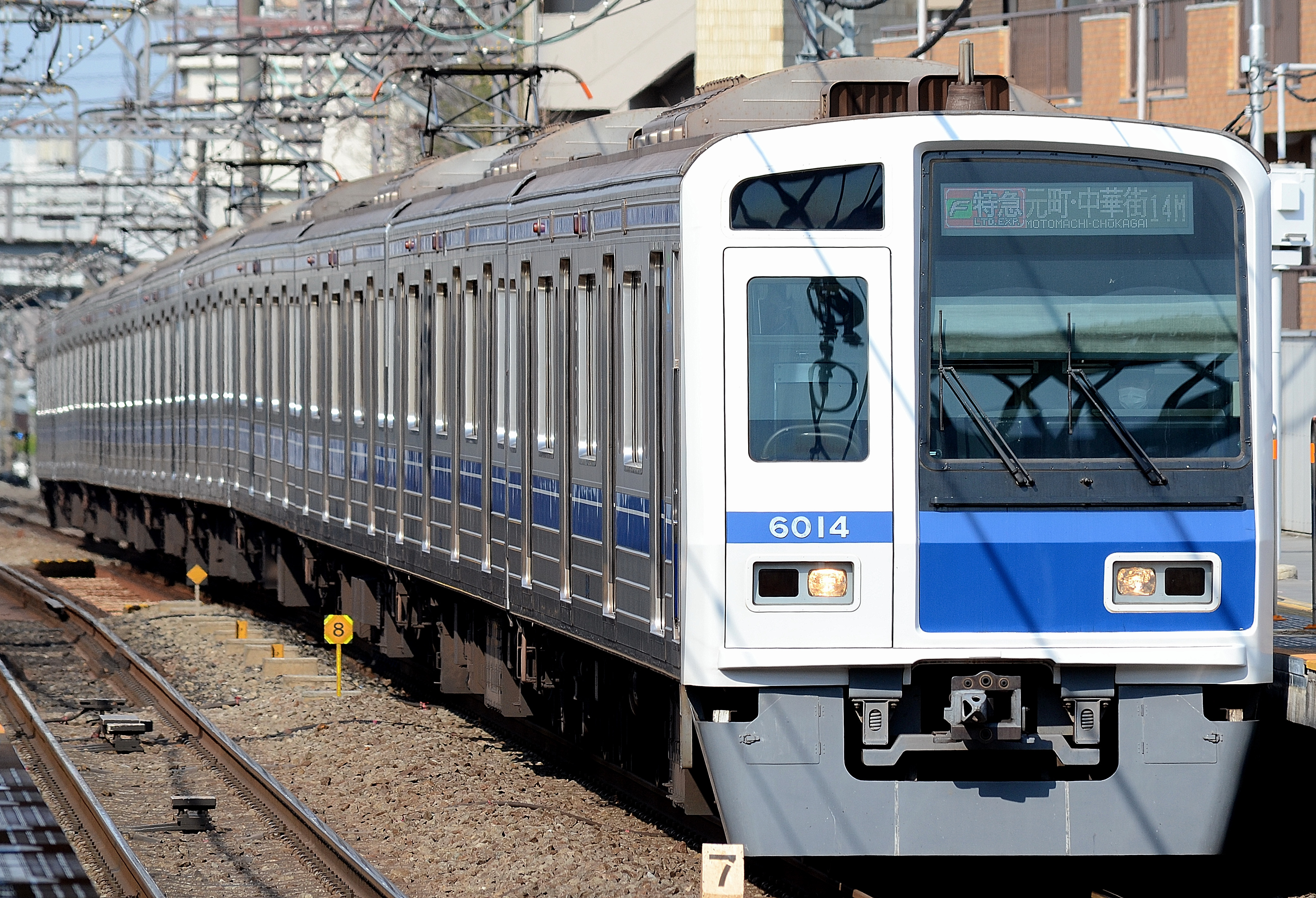
Seibu 6000 series

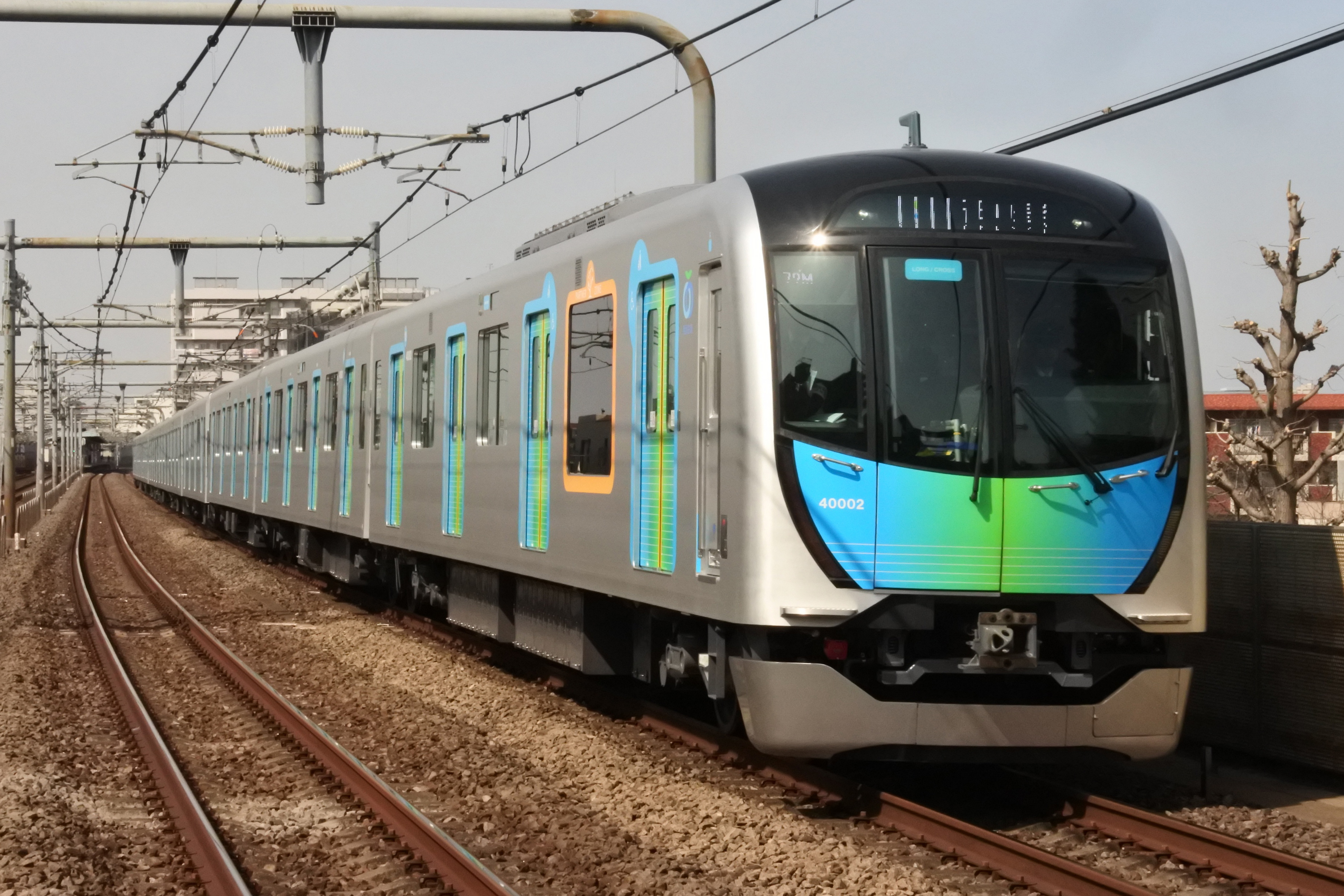
Seibu 40000 series

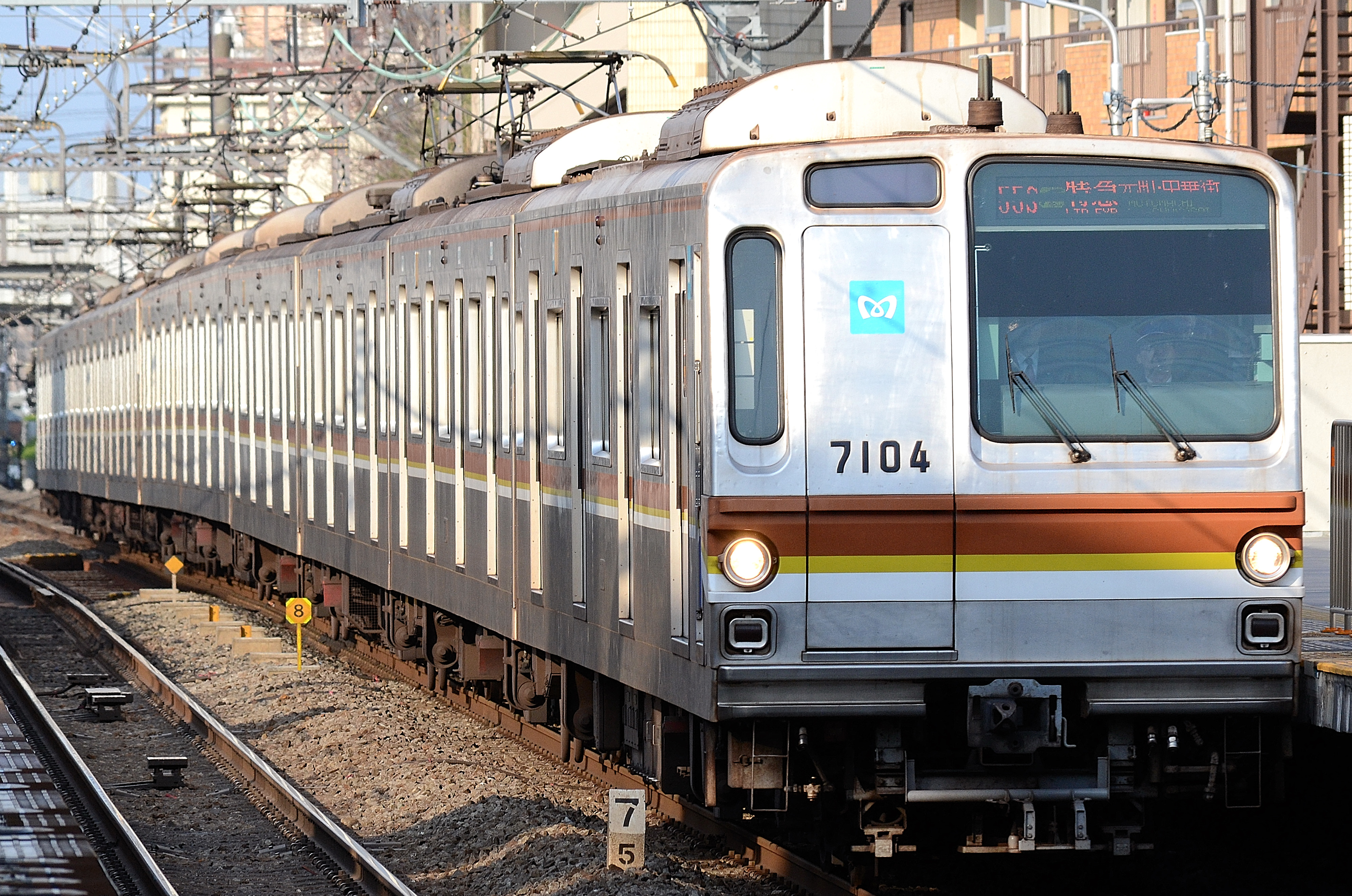
Tokyo Metro 7000 series

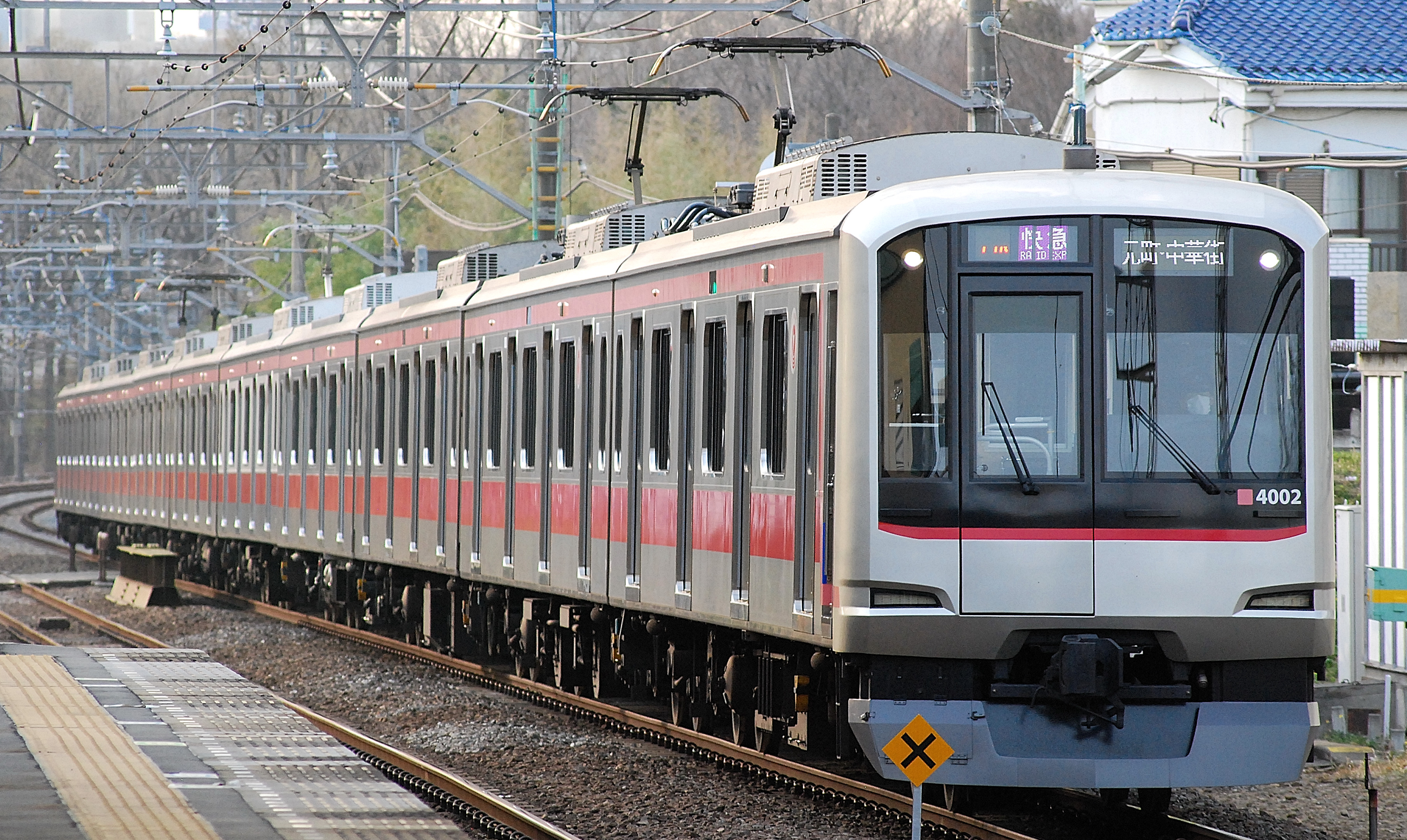
Tokyu 5050-4000 series

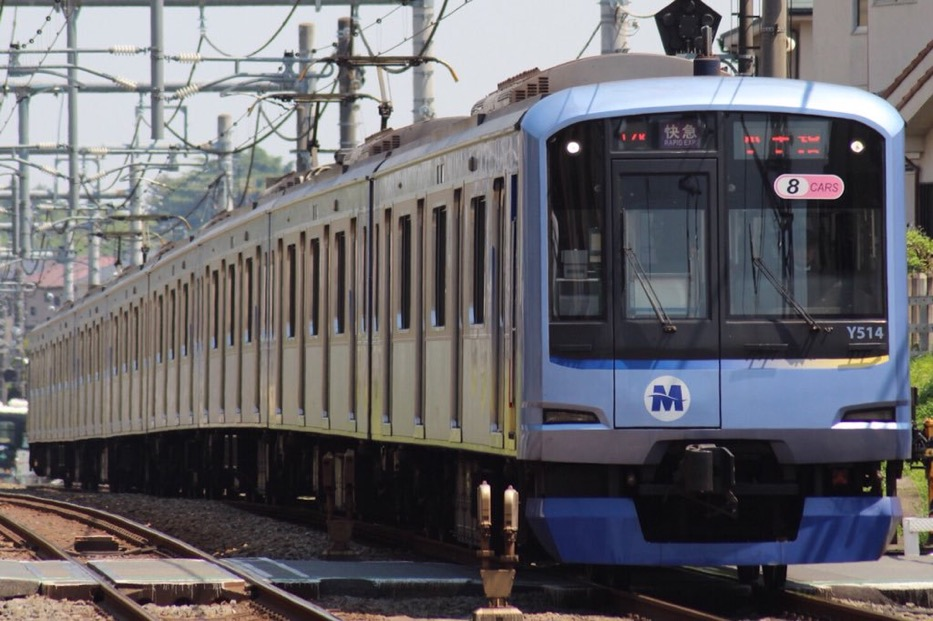
Yokohama Minatomirai Railway Y500 series

=== Past rolling stock ===
- Tokyo Metro 07 series
- Tokyo Metro 7000 series

== History ==
The line started out with the section between Shin-Sakuradai and Kotake-Mukaihara, and began through operations with the TRTA (now Tokyo Metro) Yūrakuchō Subway Line. At this point, the line did not connect with any other Seibu Line, so only TRTA trainsets were used. In 1994, the line was extended from Shin-Sakuradai to Nerima, connecting with the Ikebukuro Line. Because of track elevation work at Nerima, only one track was used. Later in 1998, the section between Shin-Sakuradai and Nerima became double-tracked, and through services with the Ikebukuro Line began.

Station numbering was introduced on all Seibu Railway lines during fiscal 2012, with Seibu Yurakucho Line stations numbered prefixed with the letters "SI" (part of the Ikebukuro group of lines).

From 10 September 2012, 10-car 5050-4000 series sets entered revenue service on the Seibu Yurakucho Line and Ikebukuro Line, with inter-running through to the Tokyo Metro Fukutoshin Line.
