= T. J. (given name) =

The initials T. J. are used by several noted people. This is often an abbreviation for their first and middle names, but can also be used when their first name starts with T, and the 'J' stands for Junior suffix (as in T. J. Ward), or can even be the legal first name.

== Notable people with the given name "T. J." include ==
=== A ===
- T. J. Ackerman (born 1975), American football player
- T. J. Acree (born 1982), American football player
- TJ Alford (born 2006), American football player
- T. J. Alldridge (1847–1916), British colonial administrator
- T. J. Anderson (disambiguation), multiple people
- T. J. Anjalose (born 1959), Indian politician
- T. J. Atwood (born 1997), American basketball player

=== B ===
- T. J. Barnes (born 1990), American football player
- T. J. Bass (1932–2011), American author
- T. J. Bass (American football) (born 1999), American football player
- T. J. Beam (born 1980), American baseball player
- T. J. Bell (born 1980), American racing driver
- T. J. Benson, Nigerian photographer
- T. J. Berry (born 1965), American politician
- T. J. Binyon (1936–2004), English author
- T. J. Bohn (born 1980), American baseball player
- T.J. Bollers (born 2002), American football player
- T. J. Bonner, American politician
- T. J. Bouldin (1878–1939), American politician
- T. J. Bray (born 1992), American basketball player
- T. J. Brennan (born 1989), American ice hockey player
- T. J. Brennan (hurler) (born 2000), Irish hurler
- T. J. Brodie (born 1990), Canadian ice hockey player
- T.J. Brown (born 1990), American mixed martial artist
- T. J. Brown (baseball) (1915–1973), American baseball player
- T. J. Bruce (born 1982), American baseball coach
- T. J. Brunson (born 1997), American football player
- T. J. Bryan (born 1945), American educator
- T. J. Buchanan (born 1993), American basketball coach
- T. J. Burke (born 1972), Canadian lawyer
- T. J. Burton (born 1983), Canadian baseball player
- TJ Bush (born 1997), American soccer player

=== C ===
- T. J. Campbell (disambiguation), multiple people
- T. J. Campion (1918–1996), American football player
- T. J. Carrie (born 1990), American football player
- T. J. Carter (disambiguation), multiple people
- T. J. Casner (born 1994), American soccer player
- T. J. Caystile (1848–1884), American printer
- T. J. Chandrachoodan (born 1940), Indian politician
- T. J. Clark (disambiguation), multiple people
- T. J. Clemmings (born 1991), American football player
- T. J. Cline (born 1994), American-Israeli basketball player
- T. J. Cloutier (born 1939), American poker player
- T. J. Cobden-Sanderson (1840–1922), English artist
- T. J. Collins (1844–1925), American architect
- T. J. Conley (born 1985), American football player
- T. J. Connolly (hurler) (born 1971), Irish hurler
- T. J. Connolly (ice hockey), American ice hockey player
- T. J. Cook (born 1982), American mixed martial artist
- T. J. Cottrell (born 1982), American football player
- TJ Cox (born 1963), American engineer and politician
- T. J. Cummings (born 1981), American basketball player
- T. J. Cunningham (1972–2019), American football player

=== D ===
- TJ Davis, English singer
- T. J. Demos (born 1966), American art historian
- T. J. DiLeo (born 1990), German-American basketball player
- T. J. Dillashaw (born 1986), American mixed martial artist
- T. J. Duckett (born 1981), American football player
- T. J. Duke (born 1993), American racing driver
- T. J. Doheny (born 1986), Irish boxer
- T. J. Donovan (born 1974), American politician
- TJ Dottery (born 2003), American football player

=== E ===
- T. J. Eckleberg, Australian musician
- T. J. Edwards (born 1996), American football player
- T. J. English (born 1957), American author

=== F ===
- T. J. Fast (born 1987), Canadian ice hockey player
- T. J. Fatinikun (born 1991), Nigerian American football player
- T. J. Finley (born 2002), American football player
- T. J. Ford (born 1983), American basketball player
- T. J. Fowler (1910–1982), American musician
- T. J. Frier (born 1977), American football player

=== G ===
- T. J. Gibbs (born 1997), American basketball player
- T. J. Gnanavel, Indian film director
- T. J. Gore (born 1987), American soccer player
- T. J. Goree (1835–1905), American general
- T. J. Gottesdiener (born 1955), American architect
- T. J. Govindrajan, Indian politician
- T. J. Graham (born 1989), American football player
- T. J. Green (born 1995), American football player
- T. J. Greenway (1854–1946), English metallurgist
- TJ Guy (born 2003), American football player

=== H ===
- TJ Hall (born 2004), American football player
- T. J. Hamblin (1943–2012), British scientist
- T. J. Hampton (??–1901), American serial killer
- TJ Harden (born 2004), American football player
- T. J. Harris (born 1982), American musician
- T. J. Harvey (born 1982), Canadian politician
- T. J. Haws (born 1995), American basketball player
- T. J. Healey (1866–1944), American horse breeder
- T. J. Heath (born 1987), American football player
- T. J. Helmerich, American sound engineer
- T. J. Hensick (born 1985), American ice hockey player
- T. J. Hill (born 1980), American football player
- T. J. Hockenson (born 1997), American football player
- T. J. Hollowell (born 1981), American football coach
- T. J. Holmes (born 1977), American news anchor
- T. J. Holyfield (born 1995), American basketball player
- T. J. Hooks, American politician
- T. J. Hopkins (born 1997), American baseball player
- T. J. Houshmandzadeh (born 1977), American football player
- T. J. Huddleston Sr. (1876–1959), American entrepreneur
- T. J. Hughes (ice hockey) (born 2001), Canadian ice hockey player

=== J ===
- T. J. Jackson (disambiguation), multiple people
- T. J. Jagodowski (born 1971), American comedian
- T. J. Jarrett (born 1973), American software developer
- T. J. Jemison (1918–2013), American religious figure
- T. J. Jenkin (1885–1965), English professor
- T. J. Johnson (disambiguation), multiple people
- T. J. Johnston (born 1956), American lawyer and bishop
- T. J. Jones (born 1992), American football player
- T. J. Jordan (born 1985), American basketball player
- T. J. Saneesh Kumar Joseph (born 1979), Indian politician

=== K ===
- T. J. Kemp (born 1981), Canadian ice hockey player
- T. J. Kilgallon (born 1961), Irish Gaelic football

=== L ===
- T. J. Lang (born 1987), American football player
- T. J. Lavin (born 1976), American television host
- T. J. Leaf (born 1997), Israeli-American basketball player
- T. J. Jackson Lears (born 1947), American historian
- T. J. Lee (born 1991), American football player
- T. J. Logan (born 1994), American football player
- T. J. Lottie, American singer
- T. J. Lowther (born 1986), American actor
- T. J. Luther (born 2000), American football player
- T. J. Luxmore, Canadian ice hockey referee
- T. J. Lynch (born 1964), American screenwriter

=== M ===
- T. J. MacGregor (born 1947), Venezuelan-American author
- T. J. Maguranyanga (born 2002), Zimbabwean rugby union and gridiron football player
- T. J. Maher (1922–2002), Irish politician
- T. J. Marti (born 1981), American businessman and politician
- T. J. Martin (born 1979), American filmmaker
- T. J. Martinez (1970–2014), American priest
- T. J. Mathews (born 1970), American baseball player
- T. J. McConnell (born 1992), American basketball player
- T. J. McDonald (born 1991), American football player
- T. J. McFarland (born 1989), American baseball player
- T. J. McKenna (born 1985), American politician
- TJ Metcalf (born 2005), American football player
- T. J. Middleton (born 1968), American tennis player
- T.J. Miller (born 1981), American actor
- T. J. Moe (born 1990), American football player
- T. J. Moore (born 2006), American football player
- T. J. Morgan (1907–1986), Welsh academic
- T. J. Mulock (born 1985), Canadian-German ice hockey player

=== O ===
- T. J. S. O'Halloran (1835–1922), Australian judge
- T. J. O'Malley (1915–2009), Irish-American engineer
- T. J. Osborne (born 1984), American musician
- T. J. Oshie (born 1986), American ice hockey player
- T. J. Otzelberger (born 1977), American basketball coach

=== P ===
- T. J. Parker (born 1984), French basketball player
- T. J. Parker (American football) (born 2004), American football player
- T. J. Parsell (born 1960), American writer
- T. J. Pempel, American professor
- T. J. Pereira (born 1976), Brazilian jockey
- T. J. Perkins (born 1984), American professional wrestler
- T.J. Power, Australian actor

=== Q ===
- TJ Quinn (born 2003), American football player
- T. J. Quinn, American reporter

=== R ===
- T. J. Racer (born 1968), American bass player
- T. J. Ramini (born 1975), British actor
- T. J. Reid (born 1987), Irish hurler
- T. J. Oakley Rhinelander (1858–1943), American real estate magnate
- T. J. Richards (1850–1939), Australian coachmaker
- T. J. Rivera (born 1988), American baseball player
- T. J. Rives, American sportscaster
- T. J. Roberts (ornithologist) (1924–2013), Pakistani ornithologist
- T. J. Rodgers (born 1948), American entrepreneur
- T. J. Rooney (born 1964), American politician
- T. J. Rubley (born 1968), American football player
- T. J. Rumfield (born 2000), American baseball player
- T. J. Rushing (born 1983), American football player
- T. J. Ryan (1876–1921), Australian politician
- T. J. Ryan (hurler) (born 1974), Irish hurler

=== S ===
- T. J. Sanders (born 2003), American football player
- T. J. Scott (born 1960), Canadian film director
- T. J. Sellers (1911–2006), American journalist
- T. J. S. George (born 1928), Indian writer
- T. J. Shope (born 1985), American politician and businessman
- T. J. Shorts (born 1997), American basketball player
- T. J. Sikkema (born 1998), American baseball player
- T. J. Simers (born 1950), American sports columnist
- T. J. Slaughter (born 1977), American football player
- T. J. Smith (American football) (born 1997), American football player
- T. J. Sorrentine (born 1982), American basketball player
- T. J. Southard (1808–1896), American shipbuilder
- T. J. Stancil (born 1982), American football player
- TJ Starks (born 1998), American basketball player
- T. J. Stiles (born 1964), American biographer
- T. J. Storm (born 1972), American stuntman

=== T ===
- T. J. Tampa (born 2002), American football player
- T. J. Tarsney (1846–1902), American politician
- T. J. Thomson, Australian professor
- T. J. Thorburn (1858–1923), British doctor and writer
- T. J. Thyne (born 1975), American actor
- T. J. Tindall (1950–2016), American guitarist
- T. J. Tollakson (born 1980), American triathlete
- T. J. Tomlyanovich (born 2003), American sprinter
- T. J. Tucker (born 1978), American baseball player
- T. J. Turner (disambiguation), multiple people
- T. J. Trevelyan (born 1984), Canadian ice hockey player
- T. J. Tynan (born 1992), American ice hockey player

=== V ===
- T. J. Vasher (born 1998), American football player
- T. J. Vinod (born 1962), Indian politician

=== W ===
- T. J. Wallworth, English football manager
- T. J. Ward (born 1986), American football player
- T. J. Warren (born 1993), American basketball player
- T. J. Watt (born 1994), American football player
- T. J. Weist (born 1965), American football coach
- T. J. Williams (American football) (born 1982), American football player
- T. J. Williams (basketball) (born 1994), American basketball player
- T. J. Wilson (disambiguation), multiple people
- T. J. Wright (born 1983), American football player

=== Y ===
- T. J. Yates (born 1987), American football player
- T. J. Yeldon (born 1993), American football player

=== Z ===
- T. J. Zeuch (born 1995), American baseball player

== See also ==
- TJ (disambiguation), a disambiguation page for "TJ"
