= Teejay =

Teejay may refer to:

- Teejay Arunasalam
- Teejay Marquez
- Teejay Lanka, knitted fabric manufacturer
- Teejay Haichert
- Teejayx6

== See also ==
- TJ (disambiguation)
- Tjay (disambiguation)
- Tejay (disambiguation)
