= T&J =

T&J or T and J can refer to:

- Tampa and Jacksonville Railway, a former railroad in Florida, United States
- Tom and Jerry, American animated franchise
- Truth & Justice (role-playing game), a role-playing game

== See also ==
- J&T
- TJ (disambiguation)
