= Tejay =

Tejay may refer to:

- Tejay, Kentucky
- Tejay Antone (born 1993), American baseball player
- Tejay van Garderen (born 1988), American cyclist
- Tejay Johnson (born c. 1989) American college football player

== See also ==
- TJ (disambiguation)
- Tjay (disambiguation)
- Teejay (disambiguation)
