= TJ =

TJ may refer to:

== Fictional characters ==
- T.J. Detweiler, the protagonist of Recess
- T.J. Hammond, a character in the miniseries Political Animals
- T. J. Hooker, an American television show and title character
- TJ Wagner, a comic book character known as Nocturne
- Tamara Johansen, a character in the television series Stargate Universe
- Theodore Jay Jarvis Johnson, a fictional character from the TV series Power Rangers Turbo and Power Rangers in Space
- TJ Botsford, a character from the animated PBS Kids series WordGirl
- TJ Kippen, a recurring character on the Disney Channel series Andi Mack

== People ==
- T. J. (given name), shared by several people
- Thomas Jefferson, third president of the United States
- Teddyson John, Saint Lucian brand ambassador, singer and songwriter

== Places ==
- Tajikistan (ISO 3166-1 country code TJ)
- Tianjin, China (Guobiao abbreviation TJ)
- Tijuana, Mexico
- Torrejón de Ardoz, Spain

== Businesses and organizations ==
=== Schools ===
- Temasek Junior College in eastern Singapore
- Thomas Jefferson High School for Science and Technology
- Tongji University in Shanghai, China

=== Transport ===
- Thanjavur Junction railway station in Tamil Nadu, India (Indian Railways station code)
- Transjakarta in Jakarta, Indonesia
- Trans Jogja in Yogyakarta, Indonesia
- Tobu Tojo Line, and Ogose Line (railway line prefix TJ)

=== Other businesses and organizations ===
- T.J.'s, a nightclub and live music venue in Newport, Wales
- Trader Joe's, a chain of specialty grocery stores

== Law ==
- Therapeutic jurisprudence, the study of the effect that legal rules and procedures produce on individuals involved in legal processes
- Tribunal de Justiça, or Court of Justice, the appellate courts of Brazil

== Science and technology ==
- .tj, the country code top level domain (ccTLD) for Tajikistan
- Terajoule, a unit of energy equal to 10^{12} joules
- Thermal Junction, or Junction temperature, in semiconductors
- Tommy John surgery, a surgical procedure named after a former Major League Baseball pitcher

== Other uses ==
- Tj (digraph)
- TJ, aka Creation Ex Nihilo Technical Journal, published by Creation Ministries International
- Tamgha-i-Jurat, the fourth highest military award of Pakistan
- Jeep TJ, the Canadian name for the 1997-2006 Jeep Wrangler, an off-road vehicle
- Tajikistani somoni (Symbol TJS), the currency of Tajikistan
- A Theory of Justice, a book by John Rawls
- toimitusjohtaja, the Finnish equivalent to CEO
- Triple jump, a discipline in athletics
- Turbojugend, the international fan club of the Norwegian rock band Turbonegro

== See also ==
- Teejay (disambiguation)
- Tejay (disambiguation)
- Tjay (disambiguation)
- TJ Maxx
