= Tokyo Metro 17000 series =

Electric multiple unit train type operated in Japan

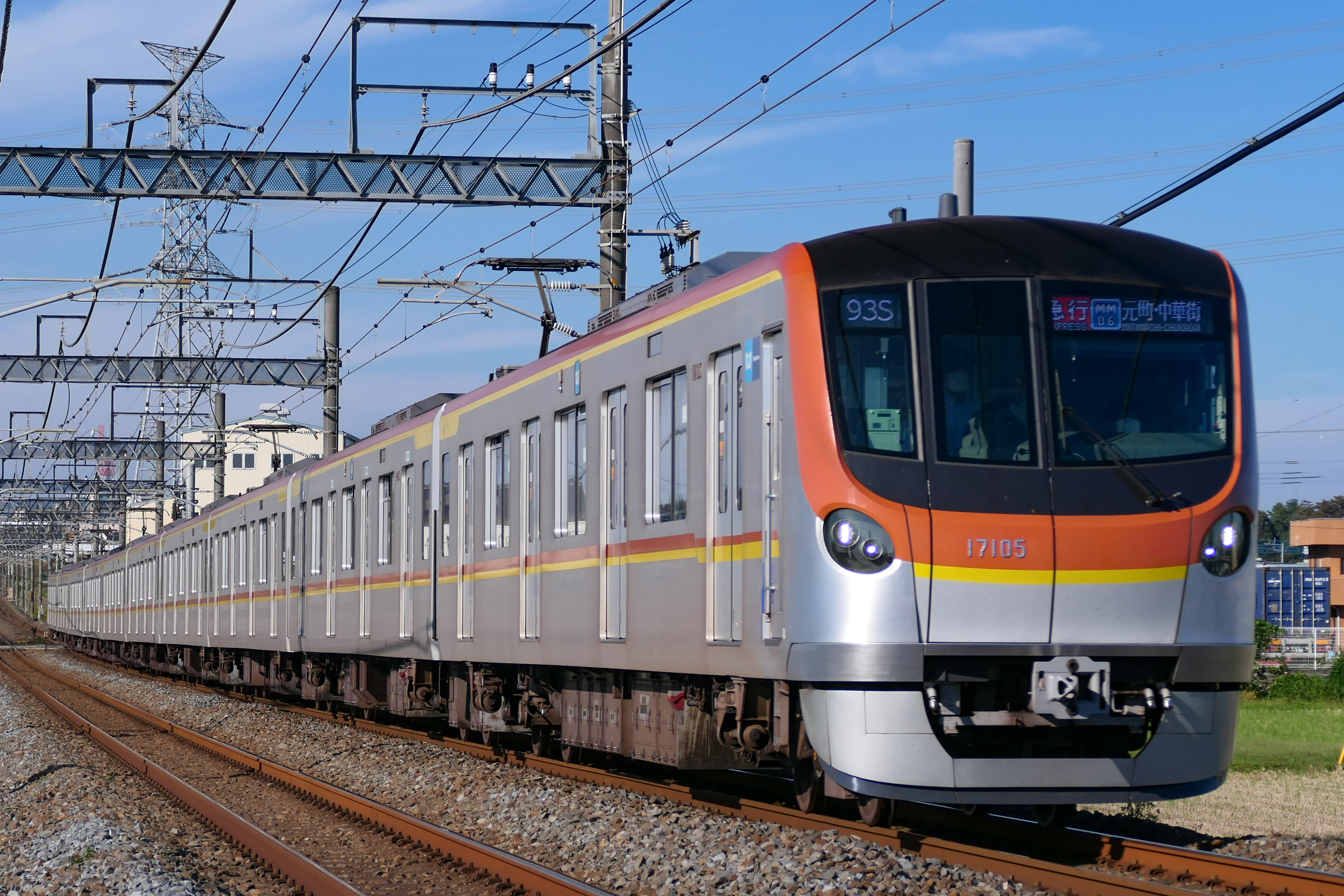
- A Yūrakuchō and Fukutoshin Lines 17000 series train
- In service: 2021–present
- Manufacturers: Hitachi (10-car sets), Kinki Sharyo (8-car sets)
- Built at: Kudamatsu, Yamaguchi Prefecture (10-car sets); Osaka Prefecture (8-car sets) (Final Assembly:Higashiosaka)
- Family name: A-train
- Replaced: Tokyo Metro 7000 series
- Constructed: 2020–2022
- Entered service: 21 February 2021
- Number built: 180 vehicles (21 sets) as of 14 May 2022
- Number in service: 180 vehicles (21 sets) as of 20 May 2022
- Formation: 8/10 cars per trainset
- Fleet numbers: 17101–17106 (10 car sets); 17181–17195 (8 car sets)
- Operator: Tokyo Metro
- Depot: Wakoshi
- Lines served: Yūrakuchō Line; Fukutoshin Line; Tojo Line; Seibu Yūrakuchō Line; Ikebukuro Line; Tōyoko Line; Minatomirai Line

Specifications
- Car body construction: Aluminium alloy
- Car length: 20 m (65 ft 7 in)
- Width: 2.8 m (9 ft 2 in)
- Height: 3,635 mm (11 ft 11.1 in)
- Floor height: 1.14 m (3 ft 9 in)
- Doors: 4 pairs per side
- Maximum speed: 120 km/h (75 mph) (design); 110 km/h (68 mph) (service)
- Traction system: 10-car sets: Mitsubishi SiC-MOSFET–VVVF; 8-car sets: Hitachi SiC-MOSFET–VVVF
- Traction motors: 205 kW (275 hp) permanent magnet synchronous motors
- Acceleration: 1 m/s^{2} (2.2 mph/s)
- Deceleration: 1 m/s^{2} (2.2 mph/s) (service); 1.25 m/s^{2} (2.8 mph/s) (emergency)
- Electric systems: 1,500 V DC overhead lines
- Current collection: Pantograph
- UIC classification: 2'2' + Bo'Bo' + 2'2' + Bo'Bo' + 2'2' + 2'2' + Bo'Bo' + 2'2' + Bo'Bo' + 2'2' (10-car sets); 2'2' + Bo'Bo' + 2'2' + Bo'Bo' + Bo'Bo' + 2'2' + Bo'Bo' + 2'2' (8-car sets)
- Coupling system: Shibata
- Track gauge: 1,067 mm (3 ft 6 in)

The Tokyo Metro 17000 series (東京メトロ17000系, Tōkyō Metoro 17000-kei) is a Japanese DC electric multiple unit (EMU) commuter train type operated by Tokyo Metro on the Yūrakuchō Line and Fukutoshin Line to replace the ageing Tokyo Metro 7000 series. It entered service on 21 February 2021.

== Operations ==
17000 series trainsets operate on the following lines.

- ■ Tokyo Metro Yūrakuchō Line (10-car sets only)
- ■ Tokyo Metro Fukutoshin Line
- ■ Tōbu Tōjō Line between Wakōshi and Shiki (8-car sets) or Shinrinkōen (10-car sets)
- ■ Seibu Yūrakuchō Line
- ■ Seibu Ikebukuro Line between Kotake-mukaihara and Hannō
- ■ Tōkyū Tōyoko Line
- ■ Minatomirai Line

== Formation ==
The fleet consists of six ten-car sets and 15 eight-car sets.

=== 10-car sets ===
10-car sets are formed as follows:

	← Shibuya, Shin-Kiba Wakōshi →									
Car No.	10	9	8	7	6	5	4	3	2	1
Designation	17100 (CT1)	< 17200 (M)	17300 (T)	< 17400 (M)	17500 (Tc1)	17600 (Tc2)	< 17700 (M)	17800 (T)	< 17900 (M)	17000 (CT)
Equipment		VVVF	BT; CP	VVVF	SIV; CP	SIV	VVVF	BT; CP	VVVF	
Wheel arrangement	○○ ○○	●● ●●	○○ ○○	●● ●●	○○ ○○	○○ ○○	●● ●●	○○ ○○	●● ●●	○○ ○○
Weight (t)	28.5	32.6	26.7	32.8	29.2	28.2	32.8	26.7	32.7	28.5
Numbering	17101 : 17106	17201 : 17206	17301 : 17306	17401 : 17406	17501 : 17506	17601 : 17606	17701 : 17706	17801 : 17806	17901 : 17906	17001 : 17006

=== 8-car sets ===
Eight-car sets are formed as follows:

	← Shibuya Wakōshi →							
Car No.	8	7	6	5	4	3	2	1
Designation	17180 (CT1)	< 17280 (M)	17380 (T)	< 17480 (M)	< 17780 (M)	17880 (T)	< 17980 (M)	17080 (CT)
Equipment		VVVF	SIV; CP	VVVF			VVVF	SIV; CP
Wheel arrangement	○○ ○○	●● ●●	○○ ○○	●● ●●		○○ ○○	●● ●●	○○ ○○
Numbering	17181 :	17281 :	17381 :	17481 :	17781 :	17881 :	17981 :	

=== Key ===
- <: Current collection device (single-arm pantograph)
- VVVF: Variable frequency drive
- SIV: Static inverter
- CP: Compressor
- BT: Battery
- ○: Unpowered axle
- ●: Powered axle

== Interior ==
Passenger accommodation consists of longitudinal bench seating throughout. Priority seating is provided at the ends of each car. LCD passenger information screens are situated above each doorway.

The floor height is 60 mm (2.4 in) lower than the floor height of the 7000 series. In addition, the 17000 series has a seat width of 460 mm (18.1 in) per person, an increase of 30 mm (1.2 in) over the seats of the 7000 series.

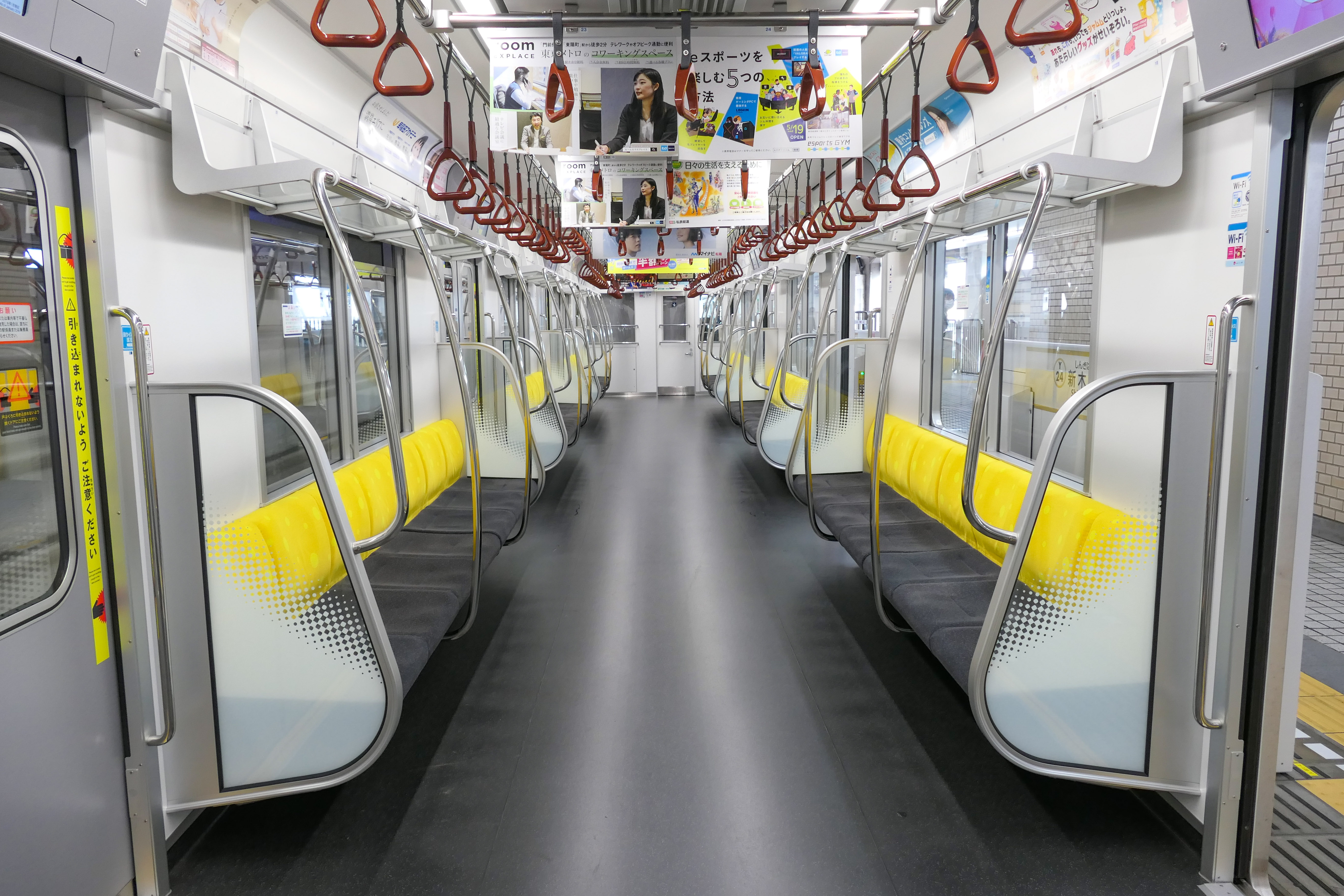
Interior view

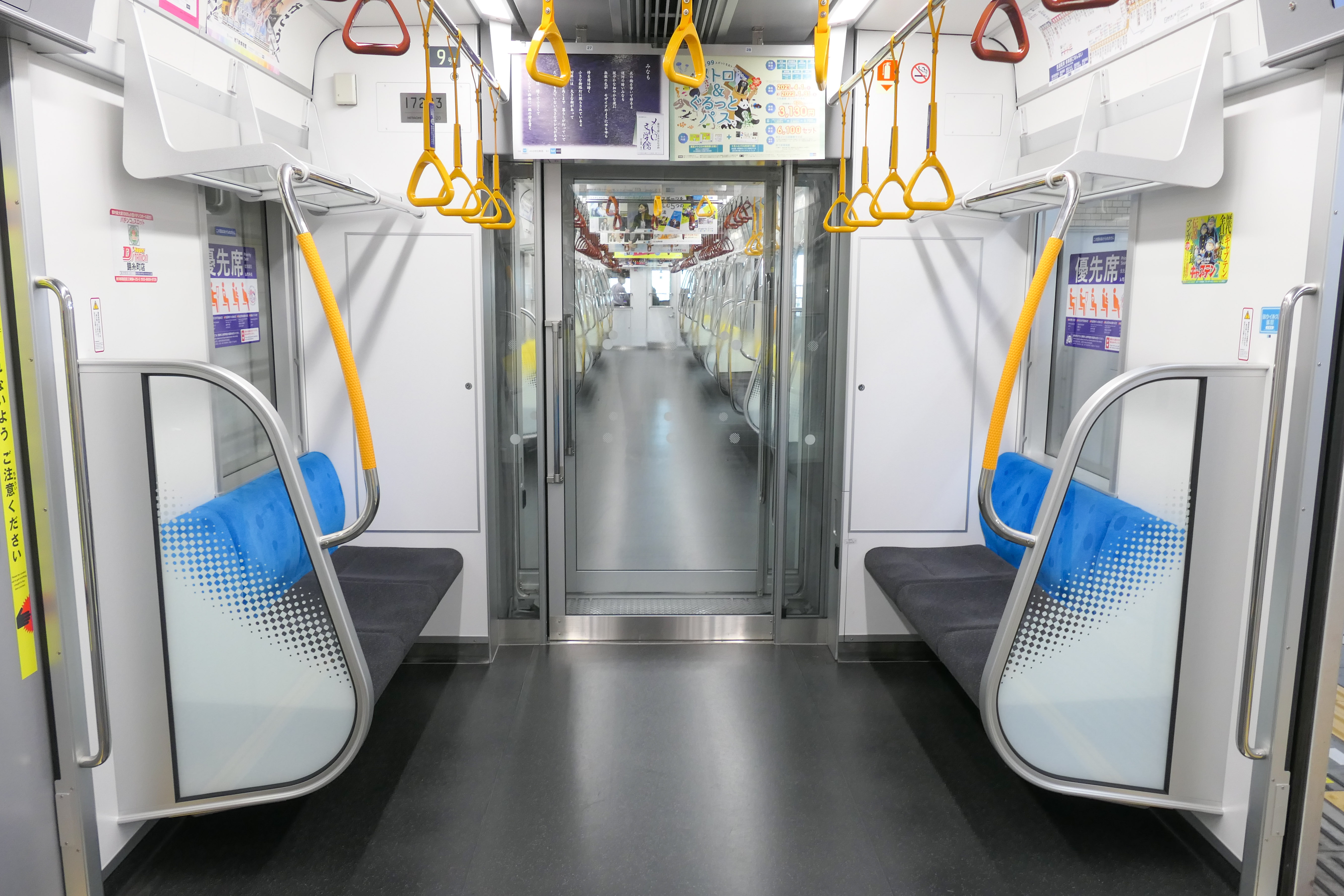
Priority seating

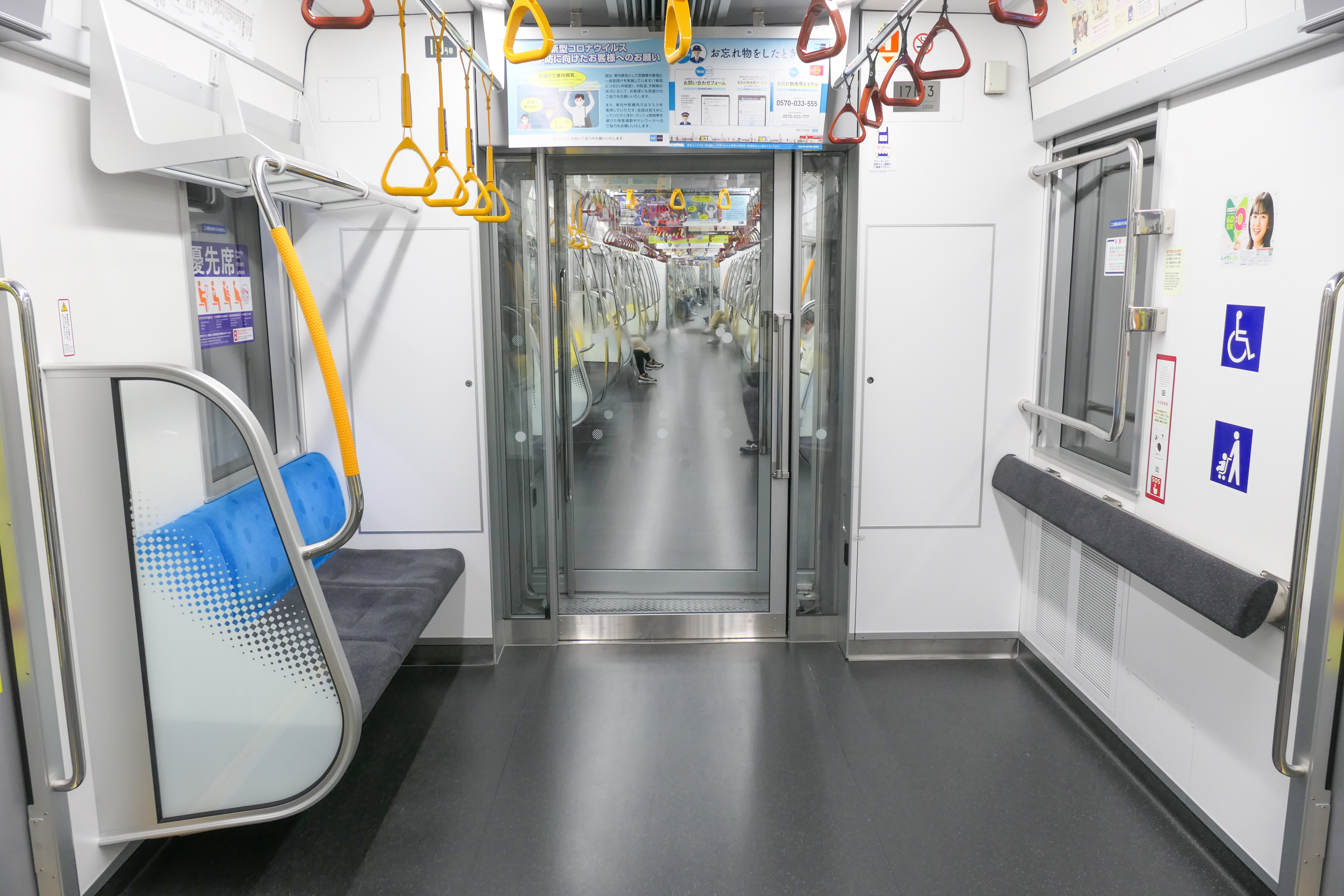
Priority seating with wheelchair space

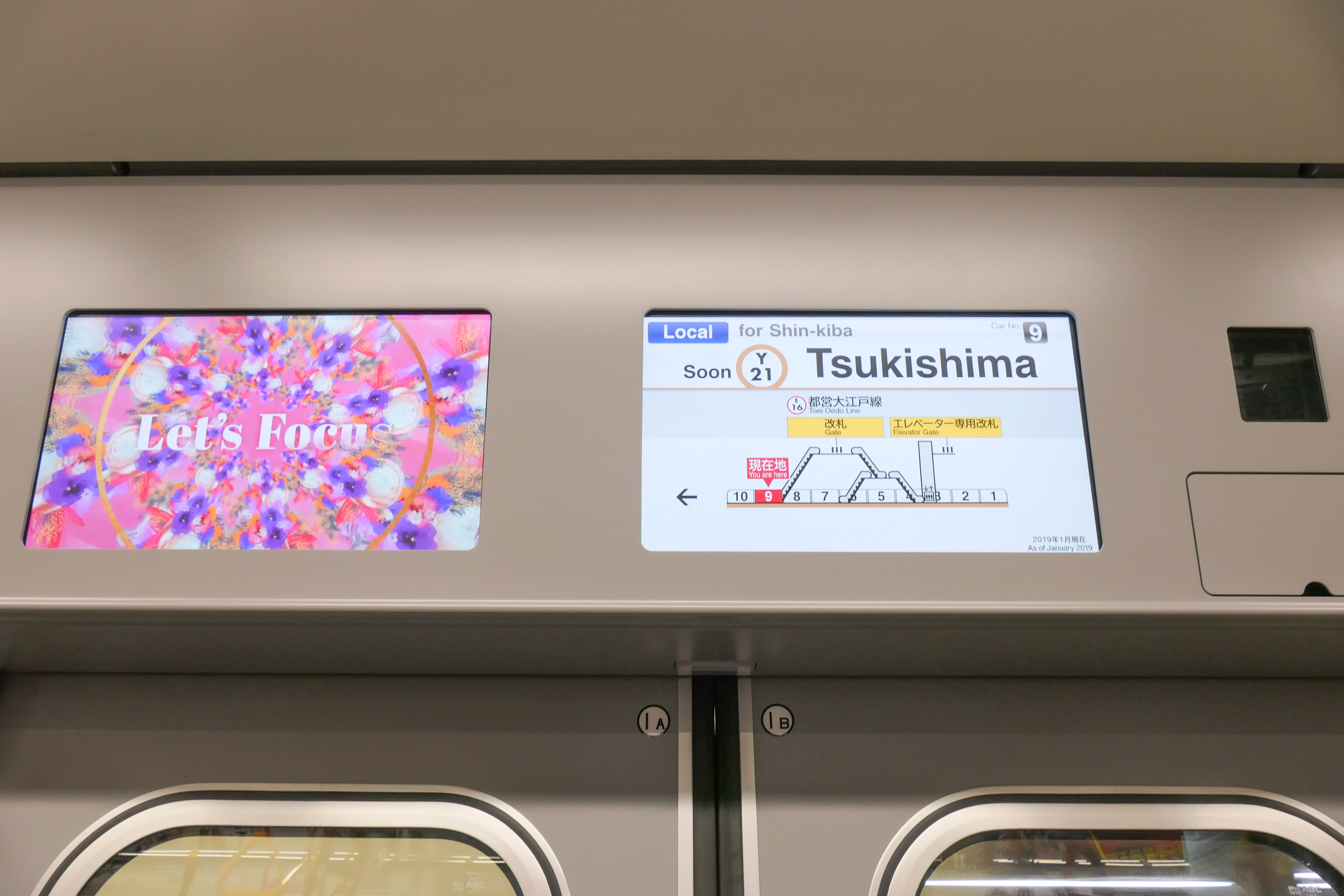
LCD passenger information screens

== Gallery ==
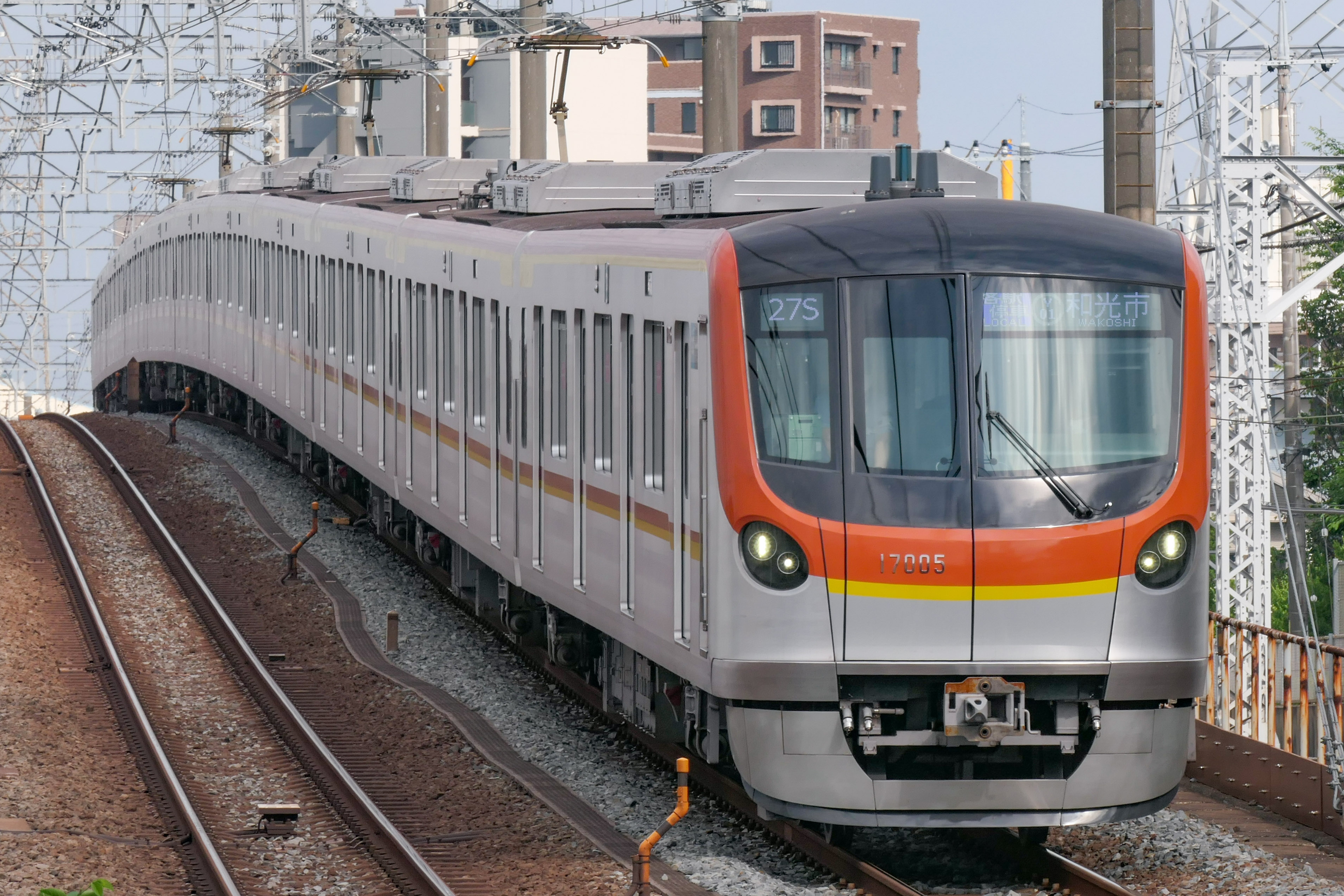
10-car set 17105 on a Tokyo Metro Yurakucho Line service in June 2021

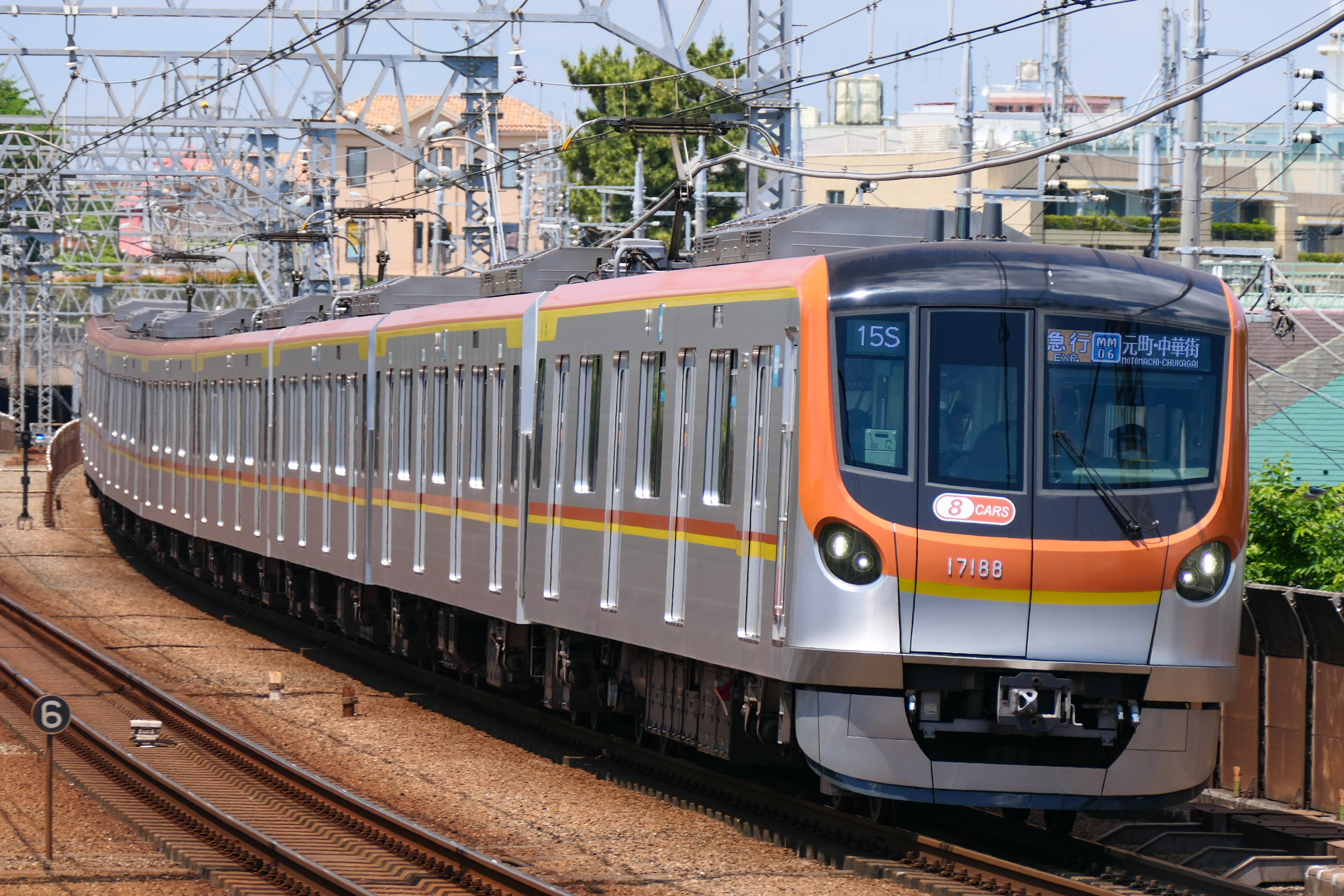
8-car set 17188 on a Tokyu Toyoko Line service in May 2022

== History ==
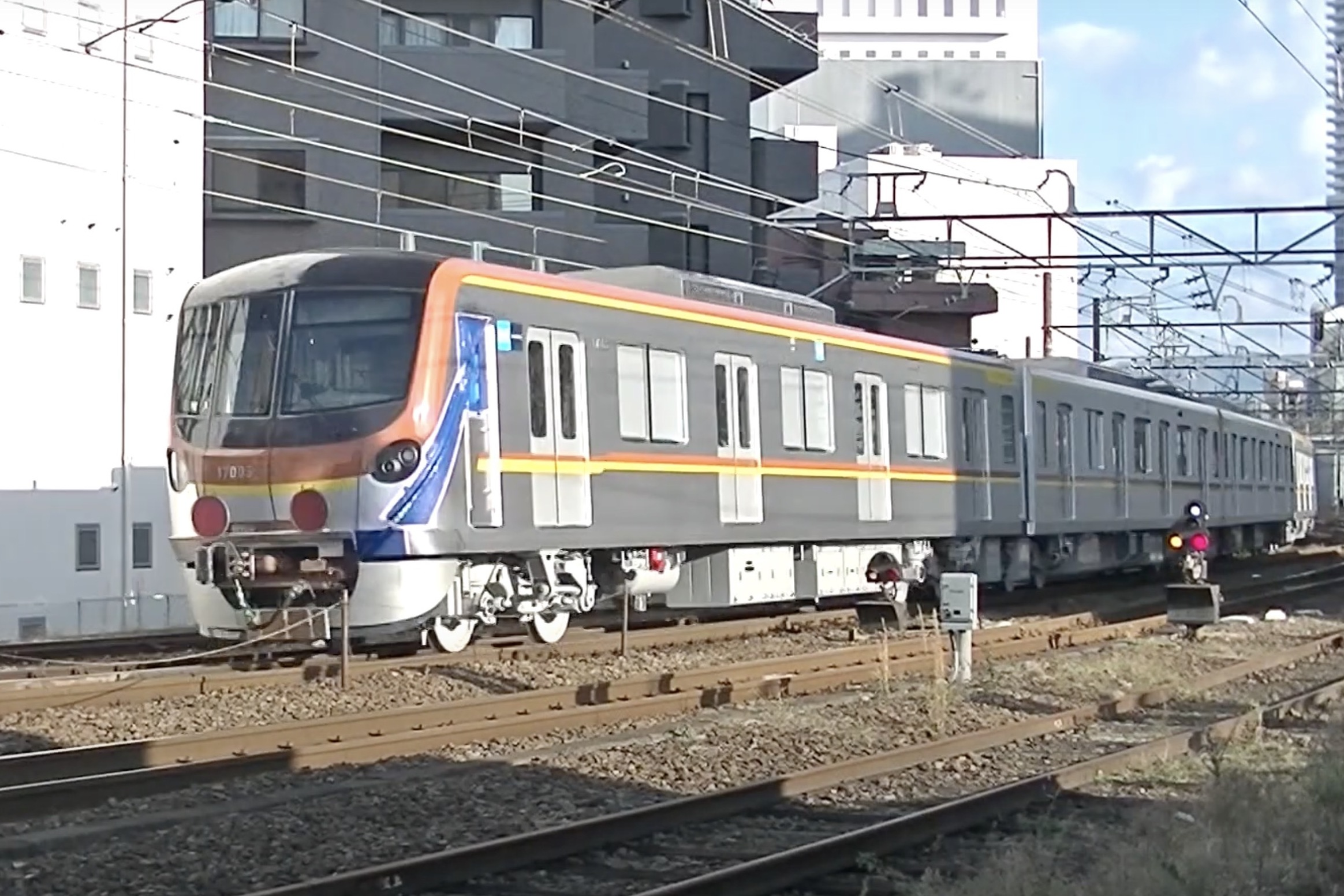
A 17000 series train on delivery in November 2020

In November 2019, Tokyo Metro announced plans to introduce a new fleet of 180 vehicles for the Yūrakuchō and Fukutoshin lines, which would replace the Tokyo Metro 7000 series.

The first trainset was delivered in January 2020.

On 26 May 2022, the 17000 series, alongside the similar 18000 series, was awarded the Laurel Prize.

=== Build histories ===
The manufacturers and delivery dates for the fleet are as shown below.

Set No.	Manufacturer	Date delivered
10-car sets
17101F	Hitachi	January 2020
17102F	Hitachi	March 2020
17103F	Hitachi	November 2020
17104F	Hitachi	February 2021
17105F	Hitachi	March 2021
17106F	Hitachi	April 2021
8-car sets
17181F	Kinki Sharyo	May 2021
17182F	Kinki Sharyo	June 2021
17183F	Kinki Sharyo	July 2021
17184F	Kinki Sharyo	August 2021
17185F	Kinki Sharyo	August 2021
17186F	Kinki Sharyo	September 2021
17187F	Kinki Sharyo	October 2021
17188F	Kinki Sharyo	October 2021
17189F	Kinki Sharyo	November 2021
17190F	Kinki Sharyo	December 2021
17191F	Kinki Sharyo	January 2022
17192F	Kinki Sharyo	February 2022
17193F	Kinki Sharyo	February 2022
