= Tōbu Keishi Line =

Former freight railway line in Tokyo, Japan

Overview
- Owner: Tobu Railway
- Locale: Tokyo
- Termini: Kami-Itabashi; Grant Heights
- Stations: 3

Service
- Type: Heavy rail

History
- Opened: 1943
- Closed: 22 July 1959

Technical
- Line length: 6.3 km (3.9 mi)
- Track gauge: 1,067 mm (3 ft 6 in)
- Electrification: Not electrified

The Tōbu Keishi Line (東武啓志線, Tōbu Keishi-sen) was a 6.3 km freight railway line operated by Tobu Railway, which ran from Kami-Itabashi Station on the Tōbu Tōjō Line, initially to a Japanese Army arsenal depot in modern-day Hikarigaoka. Following the arrival of US military forces immediately after World War 2, the area was converted to the Grant Heights housing complex (in present-day Hikarigaoka in Tokyo, Japan). The line was named in 1946 after Hugh Boyd Casey, the project engineer for Grant Heights.

The line opened in 1943 as a freight-only line, and following the opening of Grant Heights, a passenger service was introduced in December 1947, with through services operated to and from the Tojo Line terminus at Ikebukuro, but ceased in February 1948. The line closed on 22 July 1959.
