= T. J. Johnson =

T. J. Johnson may refer to:

- T. J. Johnson (American football)
- T. J. Johnson, jazz musician Fellside Records
- "T. J.", aka Theodore Jay Jarvis Johnson, redirects to List of Power Rangers characters
