= T. J. Clark =

T. J. Clark may refer to:

- T. J. Clark (art historian) (born 1943), British art historian
- T. J. Clark (racing driver) (born 1962), American NASCAR driver
- Terrance John Clark (1944–1983), head of the Mr. Asia drug syndicate
- Timothy J. Clark (artist) (born 1951), American painter
- Thomas J. Clark (1869–1907), American inventor
