= T. J. Hooks =

American politician

Member of the Florida House of Representatives from Lake County
- In office 1893–1895
- Preceded by: William A. Hocker

T. J. Hooks was an American politician who served as a member of the Florida House of Representatives.

Hooks was elected to the Florida House of Representatives in 1893, succeeding William A. Hocker as representative for Lake County, He served until 1895.
