= T. J. Turner =

T. J. Turner may refer to:

- T. J. Turner (defensive lineman), American football player
- T. J. Turner (linebacker), American football player
- Thomas J. Turner, Illinois politician
