= T. J. Thorburn =

Thomas James Thorburn (1858 - 16 January 1923), best known as T. J. Thorburn was a British Doctor of Divinity and writer.

== Biography ==
Thorburn was born in Derby. He was married to Emily Jane. They had two children, Charles and Evelyn.

He gained a B.A. degree in the Natural Science Tripos in 1879 at Christ's College, Cambridge, and was second master at Chesterfield Grammar School from 1882 to 1885. He was then Senior Science Master at Sheffield Grammar School, before his appointment as Headmaster of Caistor School. In 1897 he was appointed headmaster of Odiham Grammar School, Hampshire. He was later the headmaster of Hastings Grammar School.

Thorburn was a firm believer in the historicity of Jesus and an opponent of the Christ myth theory. Though a theological conservative and defender of the canonical history as traditionally presented, Thorburn did dissent from common evangelical bibliology.

In his book The Mythical Interpretation of the Gospels (1916) he combated the ideas of mythicists Arthur Drews, J. M. Robertson and William Benjamin Smith. It was entered into a competition and Thorburn won a prize of $6,000 from the Bross Foundation.

== Publications ==
- A Critical Examination of the Evidences for the Doctrine of the Virgin Birth (1908)
- The Resurrection Narratives and Modern Criticism (1910)
- Jesus the Christ: Historical or Mythical? A Reply to Professor Drews' Die Christusmythe (1912)
- The Mythical Interpretation of the Gospels: Critical Studies in the Historic Narratives (1916)
