= T. J. Anderson (disambiguation) =

T. J. Anderson (born 1928) is an American composer.

T. J. Anderson may also refer to:

- Thomas J. Anderson (judge) (1837–1910), Justice of the Territorial Utah Supreme Court
- T. J. Anderson (rugby union) (born 1987), Irish rugby union player
- Tyler John Anderson (born 1989), baseball pitcher
- Timothy J. Anderson (fl. 1980s–2010s), writer, classical singer, actor and composer
- Tim Anderson (defensive tackle) (born 1980), American football defensive tackle
