= Tōbu Tōjō Line =

Railway line from Saitama to Tokyo in Japan

Tobu Tojo Line

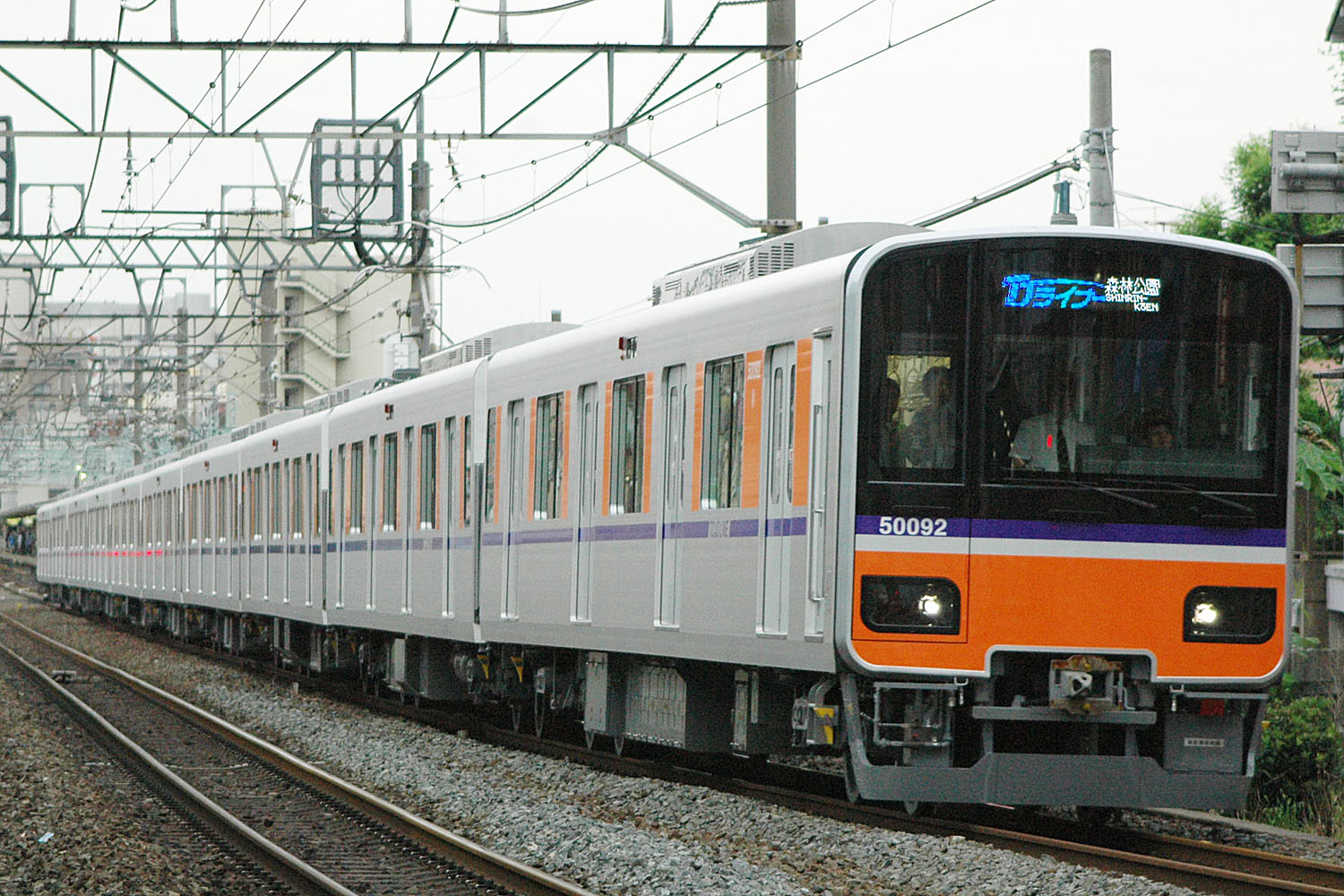
- 50090 series set on a TJ Liner service

Overview
- Native name: 東武東上線
- Status: In service
- Owner: Tobu Railway Co., Ltd.
- Locale: Kantō region
- Termini: Ikebukuro; Yorii
- Stations: 39

Service
- Type: Commuter rail
- System: Tobu Railway
- Route number: TJ
- Operator(s): Tobu Railway Co., Ltd.
- Depot: Shinrin-kōen
- Daily ridership: 954,715 (2010)

History
- Opened: 1 May 1914; 112 years ago

Technical
- Line length: 75.0 kilometres (46.6 mi)
- Track gauge: 1,067 mm (3 ft 6 in)
- Electrification: 1,500 V DC, overhead catenary
- Operating speed: 105 km/h (65 mph)

The Tobu Tojo Line (東武東上線, Tōbu Tōjō-sen) is a 75.0 km (46.6 mi) suburban railway line in Japan which runs from Ikebukuro Station in Toshima, Tokyo to Yorii Station in Yorii, Saitama, operated by the private railway operator Tobu Railway. Its official name is the Tobu Tojo Main Line (東武東上本線, Tōbu Tōjō Honsen), but it is referred to as Tobu Tojo Line (東武東上線, Tōbu Tōjō Sen) on Tobu signage and publicity information.

The Tojo Line and Ogose Line branch are isolated from other Tobu lines, such as the Isesaki Line and Nikko Line; some trains can however be transported between the Tojo Line and the rest of the Tobu network via the track connections with the Chichibu Main Line while on the ATS-Chichibu-type. There was a plan to connect between Nishiarai on the Isesaki Line and Kami-Itabashi on the Tojo Line, but this was never built.

The name of the line comes from the original plan to construct a line linking Tokyo (東京) with Jōshū (上州) (an old province now Gunma Prefecture).

== Stations ==
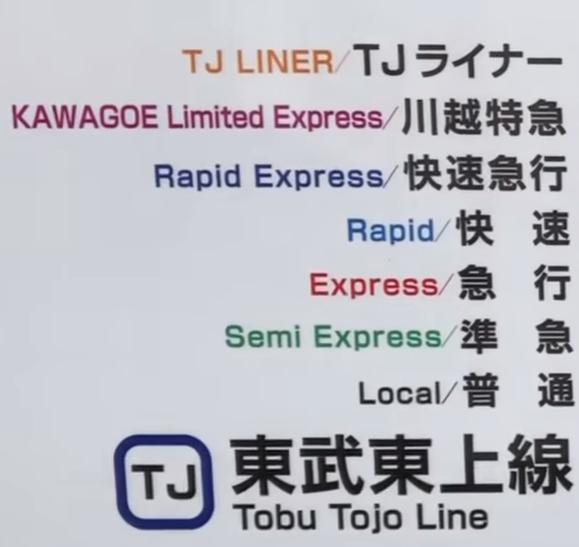
Tobu Tojo Line Service Types (as of 16 March 2019)

Abbreviations:

- L = Local (普通, Futsū) (some to/from the Fukutoshin Line and Yūrakuchō Line)
- SE = Semi Express (準急, Junkyū)
- E = Express (急行, Kyūkō) (some to/from the Fukutoshin Line)
- RE = Rapid Express (快速急行, kaisoku-kyūkō) (some to/from the Fukutoshin Line)
- KL = Kawagoe Limited Express (川越特急, Kawagoe-tokkyu)
- TJ = TJ Liner (morning "up" services and evening "down" services)
- FL = F Liner (Rapid Express (快速急行, kaisoku-kyūkō)) to/from the Fukutoshin Line, Tokyu Toyoko Line, and Minatomirai Line
- The line is operated as two sections: Ikebukuro-Ogawamachi and Ogawamachi-Yorii. There are no through services between the sections.

| No. | Station | Japanese | Distance (km) | | L | SE | E | RE | KL | TJ | FL | Transfers | Location | |
| No. | Station | Japanese | Between Stations | Total | L | SE | E | RE | KL | TJ | FL | Transfers | Location | |
|---|---|---|---|---|---|---|---|---|---|---|---|---|---|---|
| TJ01 | Ikebukuro | 池袋 | - | 0.0 | ● | ● | ● | ● | ● | ● | ● (Note: Yurakucho Line and Fukutoshin Line through services stop at their respective Yurakucho Line and Fukutoshin Line subway platforms.) | Yamanote Line (JY13); Shōnan–Shinjuku Line (JS21); Saikyō Line (JA12); Ikebukuro Line (SI01); Marunouchi Line (M-25); Yūrakuchō Line (Y-09); Fukutoshin Line (F-09) | Toshima | Tokyo |
| TJ02 | Kita-Ikebukuro | 北池袋 | 1.2 | 1.2 | ● | | | | | | | | | | | (Note: Through train services to/from the Yurakucho Line and Fukutoshin Line do not stop at any stations on the Tōjō Line south of Wakōshi.) | | Toshima | Tokyo |
| TJ03 | Shimo-Itabashi | 下板橋 | 0.8 | 2.0 | ● | | | | | | | | | | | (Note: Through train services to/from the Yurakucho Line and Fukutoshin Line do not stop at any stations on the Tōjō Line south of Wakōshi.) | Saikyō Line (Itabashi: JA13); Mita Line (Shin-itabashi: I-17) | Toshima | Tokyo |
| TJ04 | Ōyama | 大山 | 1.0 | 3.0 | ● | | | | | | | | | | | (Note: Through train services to/from the Yurakucho Line and Fukutoshin Line do not stop at any stations on the Tōjō Line south of Wakōshi.) | | Itabashi | Tokyo |
| TJ05 | Naka-Itabashi | 中板橋 | 1.0 | 4.0 | ● | | | | | | | | | | | (Note: Through train services to/from the Yurakucho Line and Fukutoshin Line do not stop at any stations on the Tōjō Line south of Wakōshi.) | | Itabashi | Tokyo |
| TJ06 | Tokiwadai | ときわ台 | 0.7 | 4.7 | ● | | | | | | | | | | | (Note: Through train services to/from the Yurakucho Line and Fukutoshin Line do not stop at any stations on the Tōjō Line south of Wakōshi.) | | Itabashi | Tokyo |
| TJ07 | Kami-Itabashi | 上板橋 | 1.3 | 6.0 | ● | ● | | | | | | | | | (Note: Through train services to/from the Yurakucho Line and Fukutoshin Line do not stop at any stations on the Tōjō Line south of Wakōshi.) | | Itabashi | Tokyo |
| TJ08 | Tōbu-Nerima | 東武練馬 | 1.4 | 7.4 | ● | | | | | | | | | | | (Note: Through train services to/from the Yurakucho Line and Fukutoshin Line do not stop at any stations on the Tōjō Line south of Wakōshi.) | | Itabashi | Tokyo |
| TJ09 | Shimo-Akatsuka | 下赤塚 | 1.5 | 8.9 | ● | | | | | | | | | | | (Note: Through train services to/from the Yurakucho Line and Fukutoshin Line do not stop at any stations on the Tōjō Line south of Wakōshi.) | (Chikatetsu-akatsuka) Yūrakuchō Line (Y-03) Fukutoshin Line (F-03) | Itabashi | Tokyo |
| TJ10 | Narimasu | 成増 | 1.5 | 10.4 | ● | ● | ● | | | | | | | (Note: Through train services to/from the Yurakucho Line and Fukutoshin Line do not stop at any stations on the Tōjō Line south of Wakōshi.) | (Chikatetsu-narimasu) Yūrakuchō Line (Y-02) Fukutoshin Line (F-02) | Itabashi | Tokyo |
| TJ11 | Wakōshi | 和光市 | 2.1 | 12.5 | ● | ● | ● | ● | | | | | ● | Yūrakuchō Line (Y-01); Fukutoshin Line (F-01) | Wakō | Saitama |
| TJ12 | Asaka | 朝霞 | 1.5 | 14.0 | ● | ● | ● | | | | | | | | | | Asaka | Saitama |
| TJ13 | Asakadai | 朝霞台 | 2.4 | 16.4 | ● | ● | ● | ● | ● | | | ● | Musashino Line (Kita-Asaka: JM28) | Asaka | Saitama |
| TJ14 | Shiki | 志木 | 1.4 | 17.8 | ● | ● | ● | | | | | | | | | | Niiza | Saitama |
| TJ15 | Yanasegawa | 柳瀬川 | 1.5 | 19.3 | ● | ● | | | | | | | | | | | | Shiki | Saitama |
| TJ16 | Mizuhodai | みずほ台 | 1.3 | 20.6 | ● | ● | | | | | | | | | | | | Fujimi | Saitama |
| TJ17 | Tsuruse | 鶴瀬 | 1.4 | 22.0 | ● | ● | | | | | | | | | | | | Fujimi | Saitama |
| TJ18 | Fujimino | ふじみ野 | 2.2 | 24.2 | ● | ● | ● | | | | | ● | | | | Fujimi | Saitama |
| TJ19 | Kami-Fukuoka | 上福岡 | 1.7 | 25.9 | ● | ● | | | | | | | | | | | | Fujimino | Saitama |
| TJ20 | Shingashi | 新河岸 | 2.4 | 28.3 | ● | ● | | | | | | | | | | | | Kawagoe | Saitama |
| TJ21 | Kawagoe | 川越 | 2.2 | 30.5 | ● | ● | ● | ● | ● | ● | ● | ■■ Kawagoe Line | Kawagoe | Saitama |
| TJ22 | Kawagoeshi | 川越市 | 0.9 | 31.4 | ● | ● | ● | ● | ● | ● (Note: Trains stop in down direction only.) | ● | Shinjuku Line (Hon-Kawagoe: SS29) | Kawagoe | Saitama |
| TJ23 | Kasumigaseki | 霞ヶ関 | 3.4 | 34.8 | ● | ● | ● | ● | | | | | ● | | Kawagoe | Saitama |
| TJ24 | Tsurugashima | 鶴ヶ島 | 2.2 | 37.0 | ● | ● | ● | ● | | | | | ● | | Tsurugashima | Saitama |
| TJ25 | Wakaba | 若葉 | 1.9 | 38.9 | ● | ● | ● | ● | | | | | ● | | Sakado | Saitama |
| TJ26 | Sakado | 坂戸 | 1.7 | 40.6 | ● | ● | ● | ● | ● | ● | ● | Ogose Line (TJ26) | Sakado | Saitama |
| TJ27 | Kita-Sakado | 北坂戸 | 2.1 | 42.7 | ● | ● | ● | ● | | | | | ● | | Sakado | Saitama |
| TJ28 | Takasaka | 高坂 | 3.5 | 46.2 | ● | ● | ● | ● | | | | | ● | | Higashimatsuyama | Saitama |
| TJ29 | Higashi-Matsuyama | 東松山 | 3.7 | 49.9 | ● | ● | ● | ● | ● | ● | ● | | Higashimatsuyama | Saitama |
| TJ30 | Shinrin-kōen | 森林公園 | 2.7 | 52.6 | ● | ● | ● | ● | ● | ● | ● | | Namegawa, Hiki District | Saitama |
| TJ31 | Tsukinowa | つきのわ | 2.8 | 55.4 | ● | ● | ● | ● | ● | ● | ● (Note: Only three up trains on weekend mornings.) | | Namegawa, Hiki District | Saitama |
| TJ32 | Musashi-Ranzan | 武蔵嵐山 | 1.7 | 57.1 | ● | ● | ● | ● | ● | ● | ● | | Ranzan, Hiki District | Saitama |
| TJ33 | Ogawamachi | 小川町 | 7.0 | 64.1 | ● | ● | ● | ● | ● | ● | ● | ■ Hachikō Line | Ogawa, Hiki District | Saitama |
| TJ34 | Tōbu-Takezawa | 東武竹沢 | 3.0 | 67.1 | ● | | | | | | | | Ogawa, Hiki District | Saitama |
| TJ35 | Minami-yorii | みなみ寄居 | 1.8 | 68.9 | ● | | | | | | | | Yorii, Ōsato District | Saitama |
| TJ36 | Obusuma | 男衾 | 1.9 | 70.8 | ● | | | | | | | | Yorii, Ōsato District | Saitama |
| TJ37 | Hachigata | 鉢形 | 2.7 | 73.5 | ● | | | | | | | | Yorii, Ōsato District | Saitama |
| TJ38 | Tamayodo | 玉淀 | 0.9 | 74.4 | ● | | | | | | | | Yorii, Ōsato District | Saitama |
| TJ39 | Yorii | 寄居 | 0.6 | 75.0 | ● | | | | | | | ■ Hachikō Line; Chichibu Main Line (CR20) | Yorii, Ōsato District | Saitama |

=== Former connecting lines ===
- Kami-Itabashi Station: The Tobu Keishi Line operated to the Grant Heights USAF housing complex (present-day Hikarigaoka) between 1943 and July 1959.

== Rolling stock ==
- ■ Tobu 8000 series EMUs (Ogawamachi to Yorii local services only)
- ■ Tobu 9000 series EMUs (also used on through-running services to Shin-Kiba on the Yurakucho Line and Shibuya on the Fukutoshin Line)
- ■ Tobu 9050 series EMUs (also used on through-running services to Shin-Kiba on the Yurakucho Line and Shibuya on the Fukutoshin Line)
- ■ Tobu 10000 series EMUs
- ■ Tobu 10030 series EMUs
- ■ Tobu 30000 series EMUs (since June 2011)
- ■ Tobu 50000 series EMUs (between Ikebukuro and Ogawamachi)
- ■ Tobu 50070 series EMUs (also used on through-running services to Shin-Kiba on the Yurakucho Line and Shibuya on the Fukutoshin Line)
- ■ Tobu 50090 series EMUs (also used on TJ Liner)
- ■ Tobu 90000 series EMUs (since 26 September 2026)
- ■ Tokyo Metro 10000 series EMUs (between Wakoshi and Ogawamachi)
- ■ Tokyo Metro 17000 series EMUs (between Wakoshi and Ogawamachi)
- ■ Tokyo Metro 17000 series 8-car EMUs (between Wakoshi and Shiki)
- ■ Tokyu 5000 series 8-car EMUs (between Wakoshi and Shiki)
- ■ Tokyu 5050 series 8-car EMUs (between Wakoshi and Shiki, since 10 September 2012)
- ■ Tokyu 5050-4000 series EMUs (between Wakoshi and Ogawamachi, since 10 September 2012)
- ■ Yokohama Minatomirai Railway Y500 series 8-car EMUs (between Wakoshi and Shiki, since 10 September 2012)
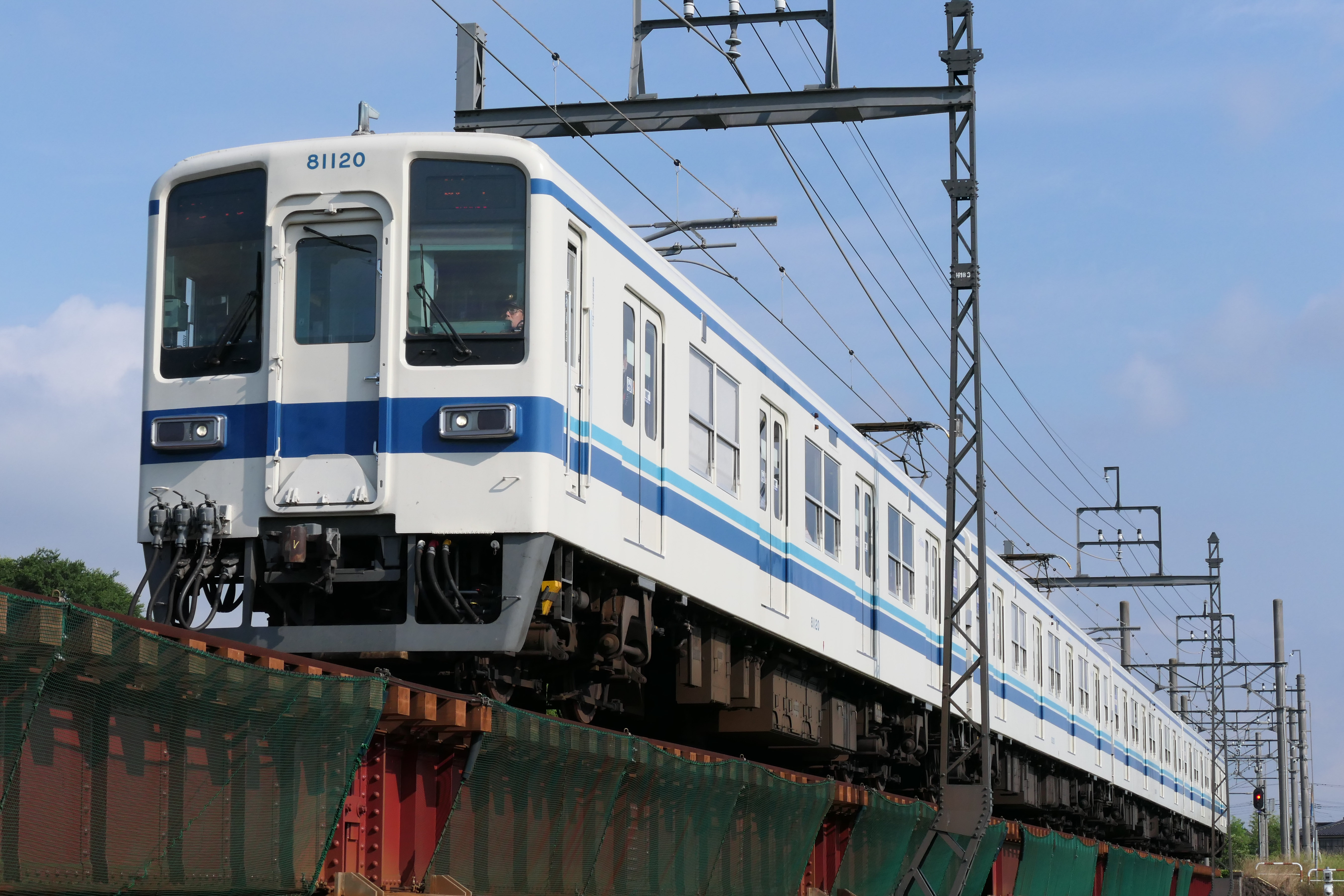
Tobu 8000 series

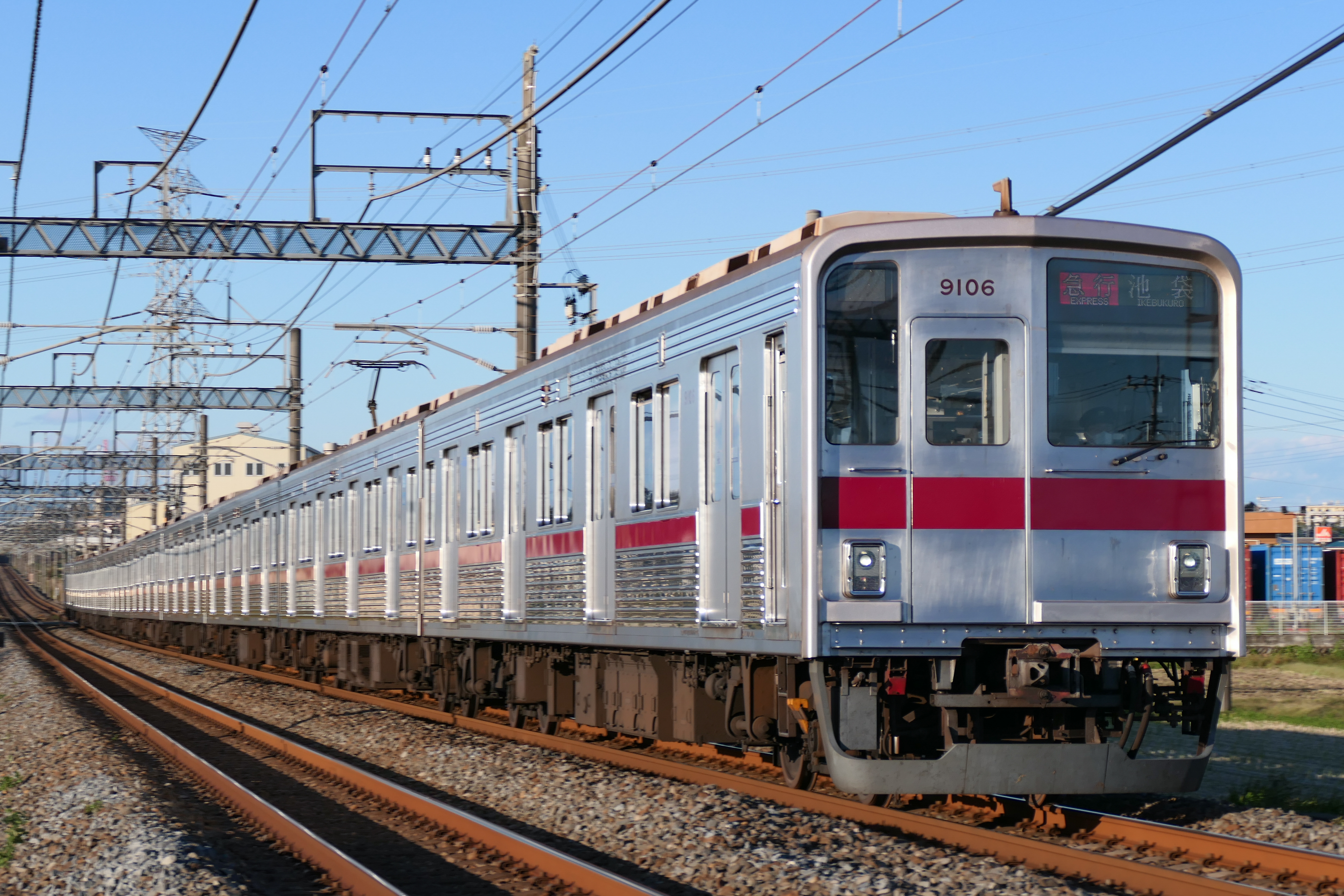
Tobu 9000 series

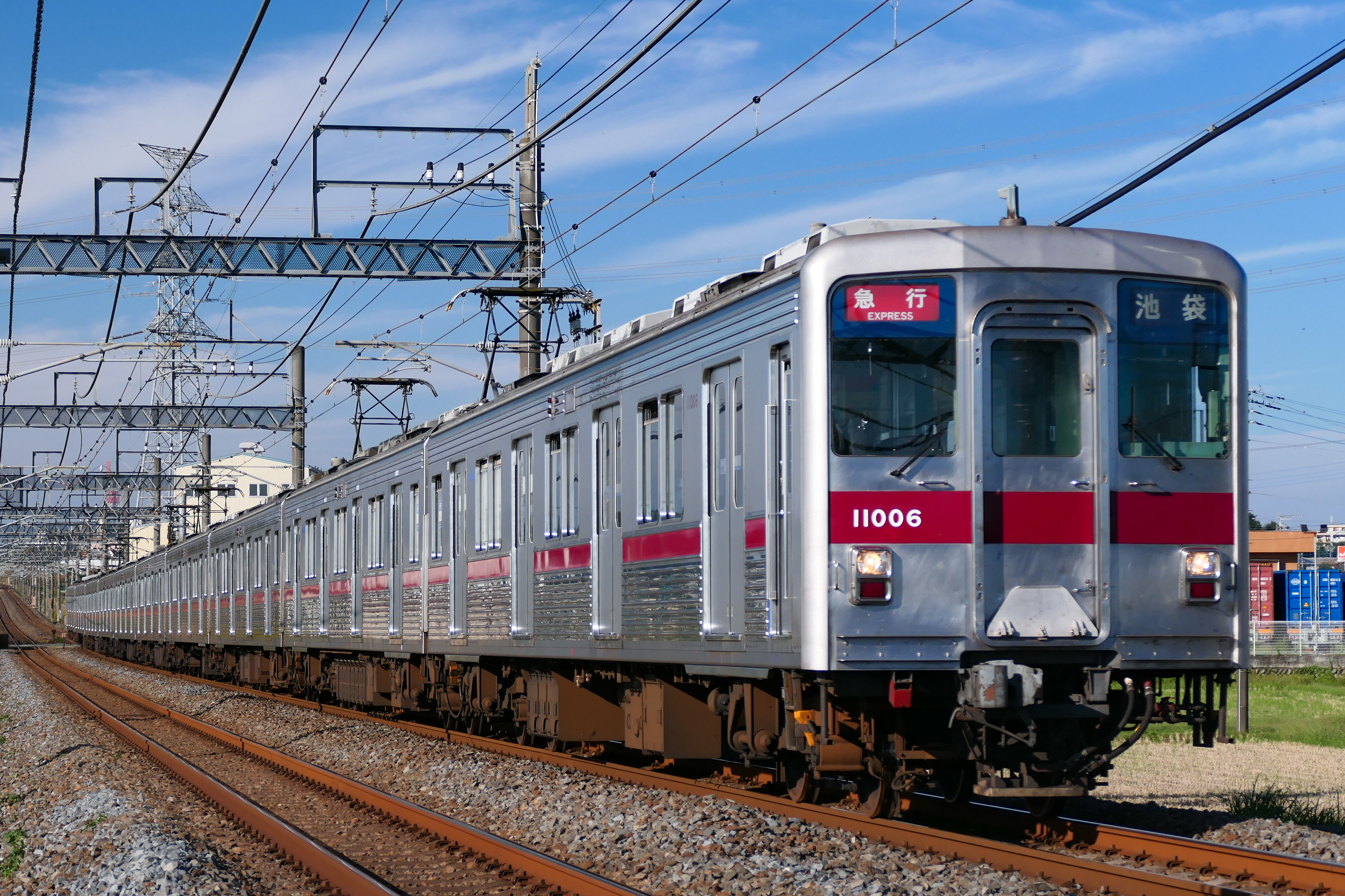
Tobu 10000 series

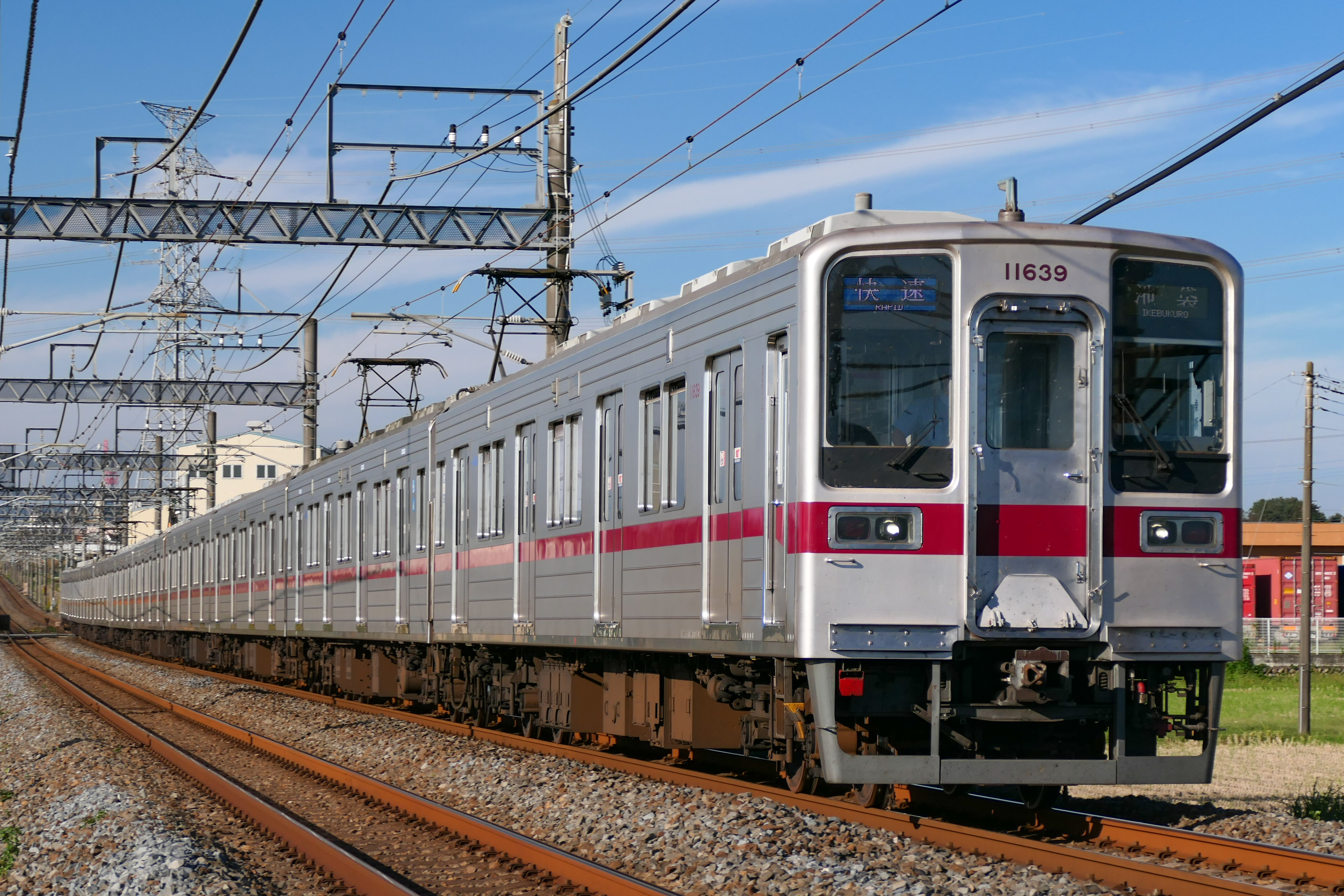
Tobu 10030 series

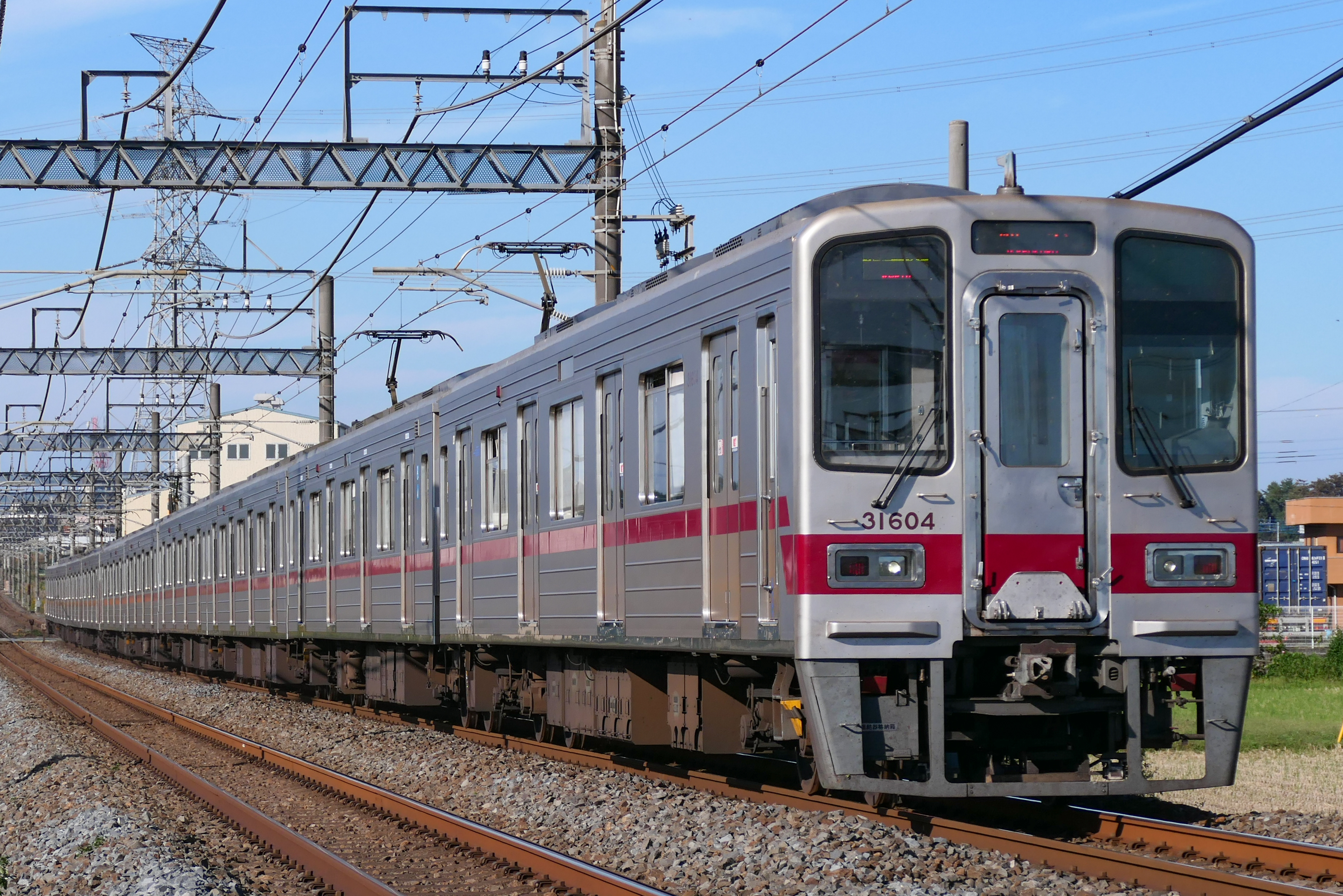
Tobu 30000 series

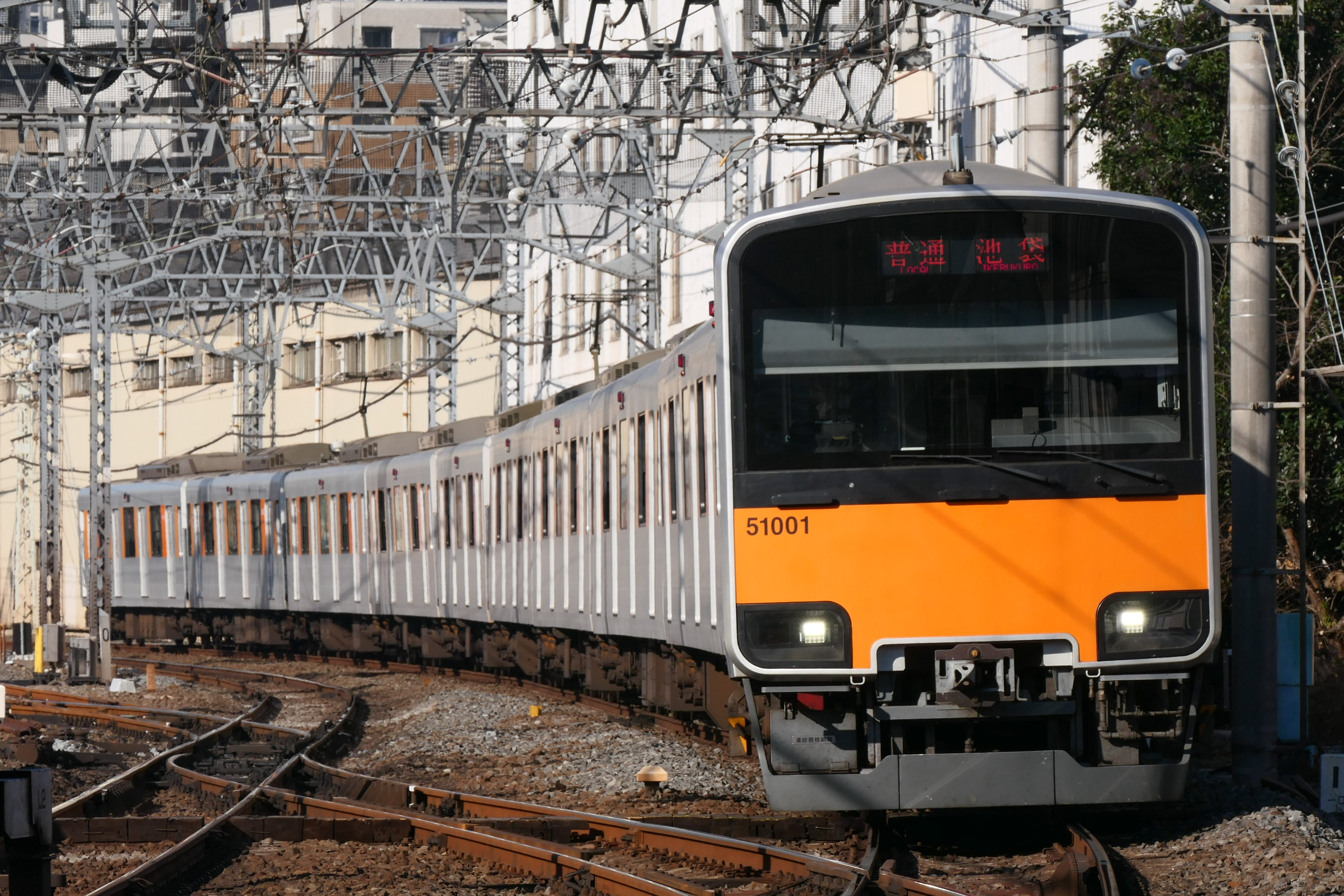
Tobu 50000 series

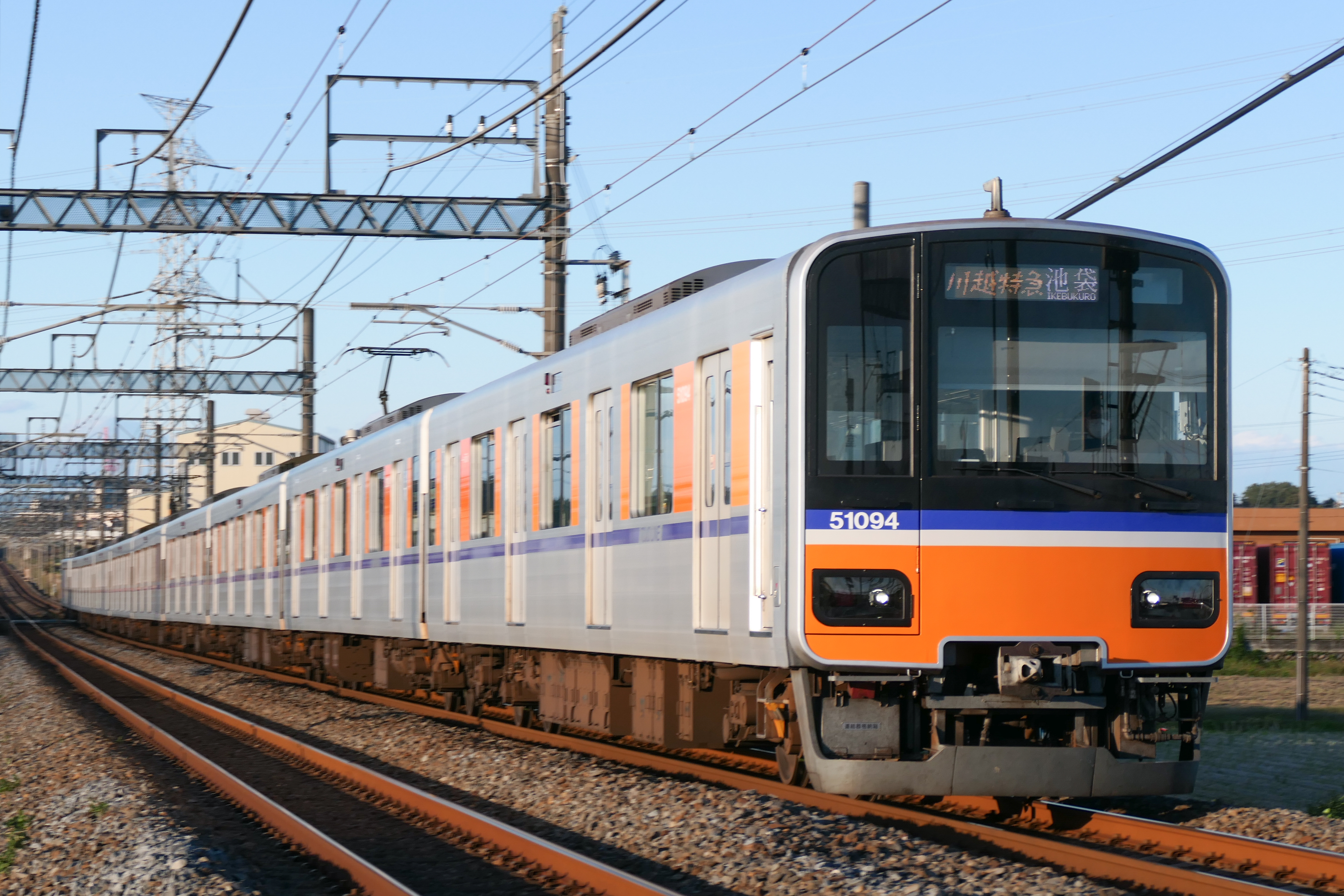
Tobu 50090 series

Tobu 90000 series

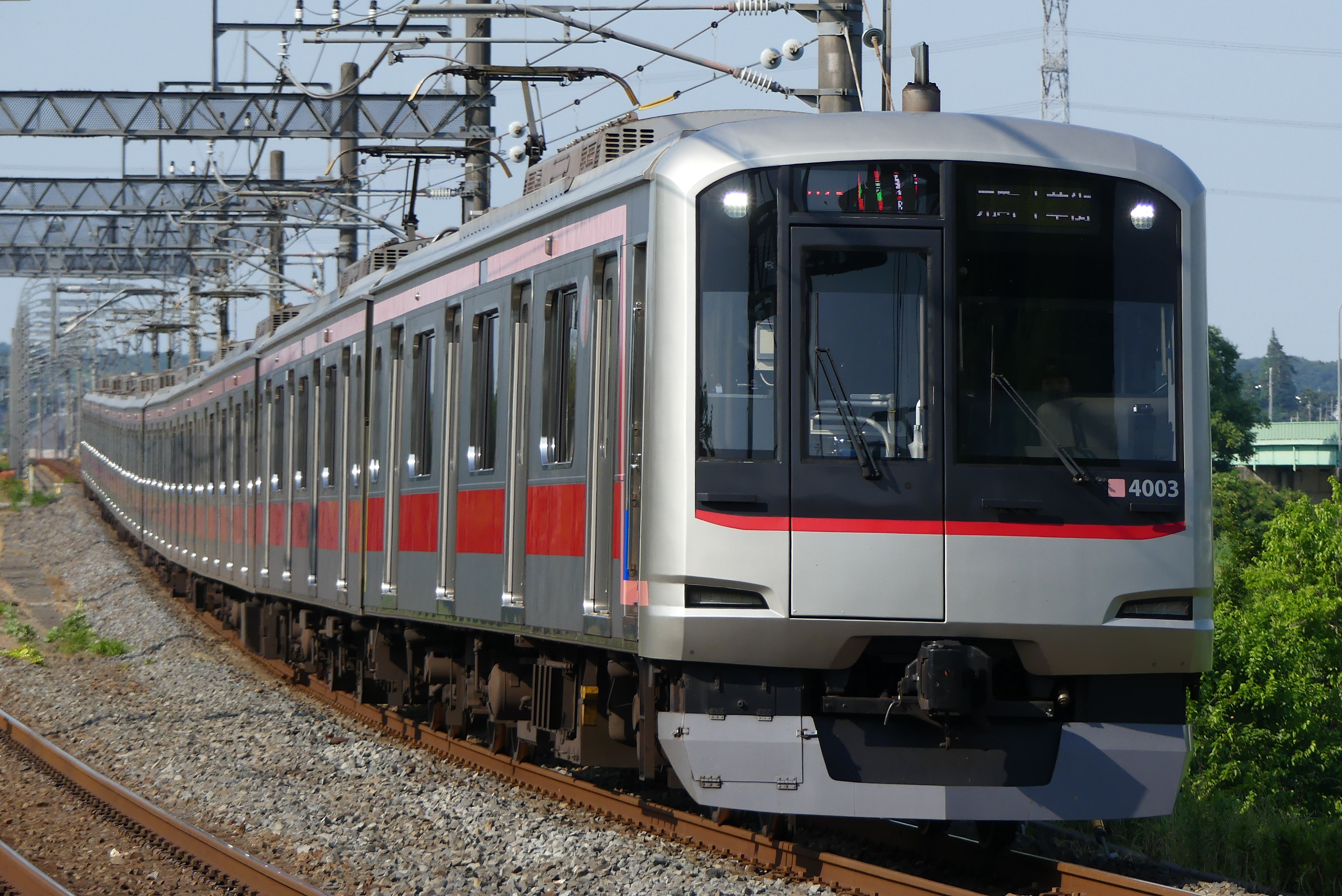
Tokyu 5050-4000 series

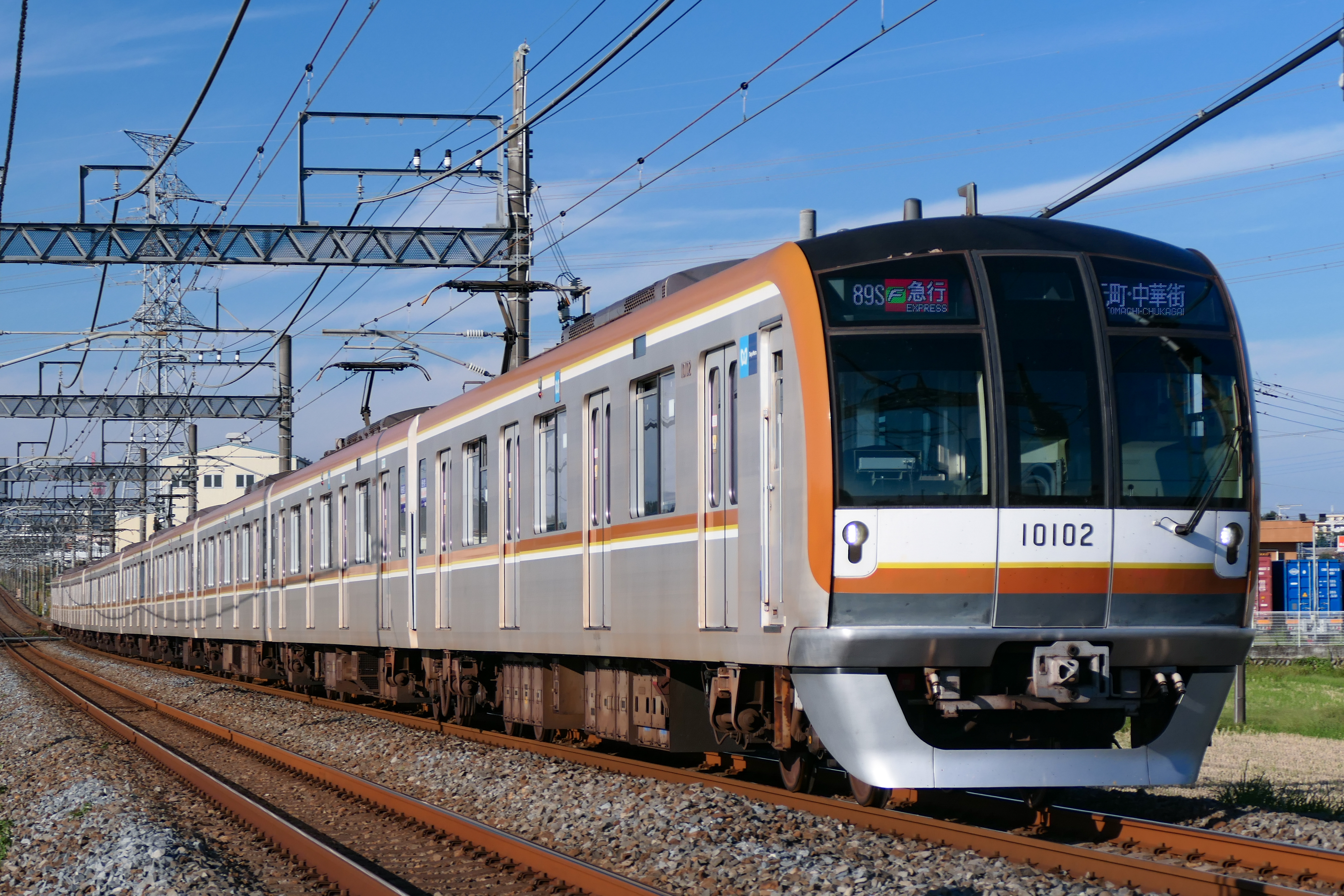
Tokyo Metro 10000 series

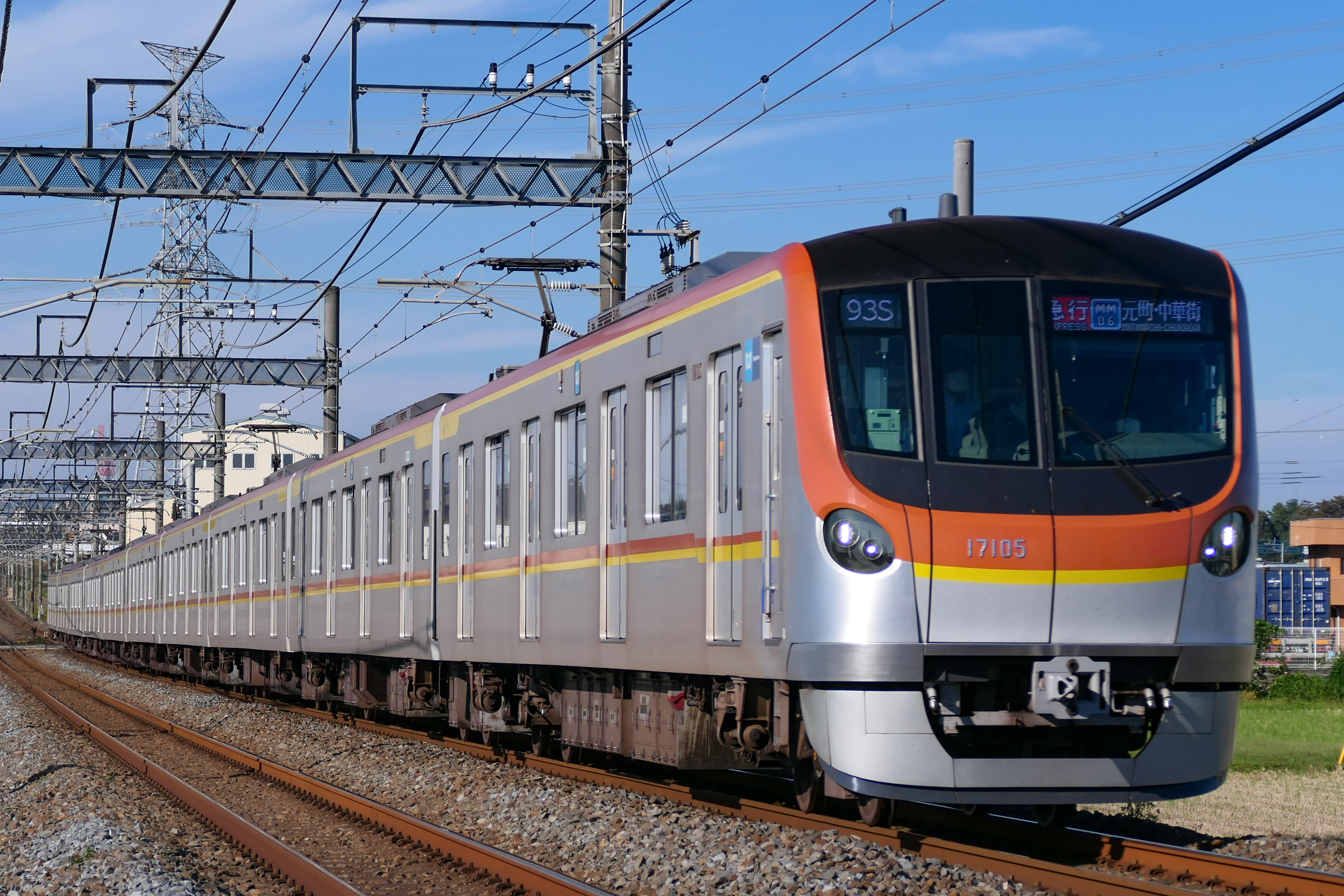
Tokyo Metro 17000 series

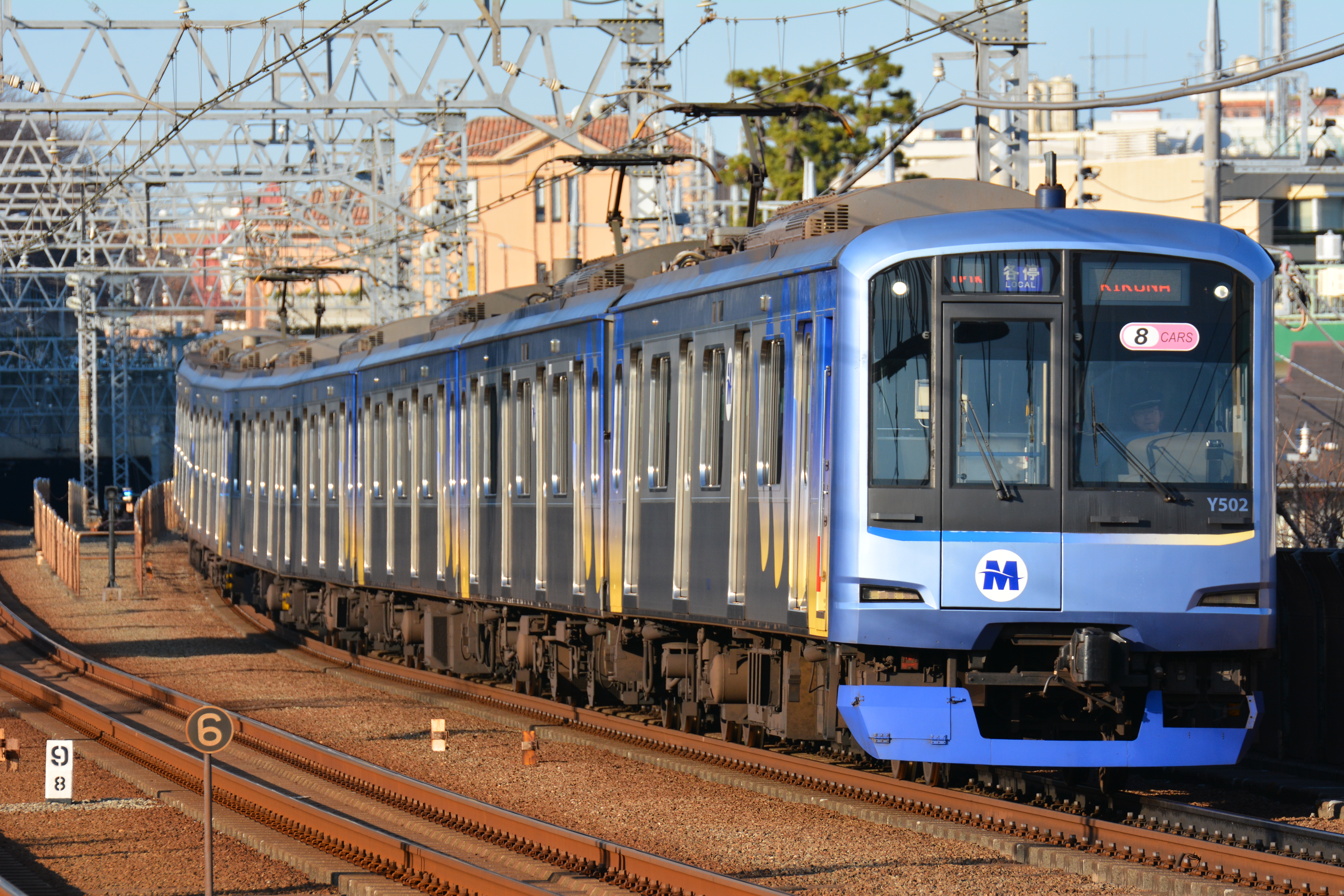
Yokohama Minatomirai Railway Y500 series

=== Past rolling stock ===
- Tobu 3000 series EMUs
- Tobu 5000 series EMUs
- Tobu 5310 series EMUs (on Flying Tojo limited express services from 1949)
- Tobu 7300 series EMUs
- Tobu 7800 series EMUs
- Tokyo Metro 7000 series 8-car EMUs (between Wakoshi and Shiki, until April 2022)
- Tokyo Metro 7000 series 10-car EMUs (between Wakoshi and Ogawamachi, until October 2021)
- Tokyo Metro 07 series EMUs (between Wakōshi and Kawagoeshi, until October 2007)
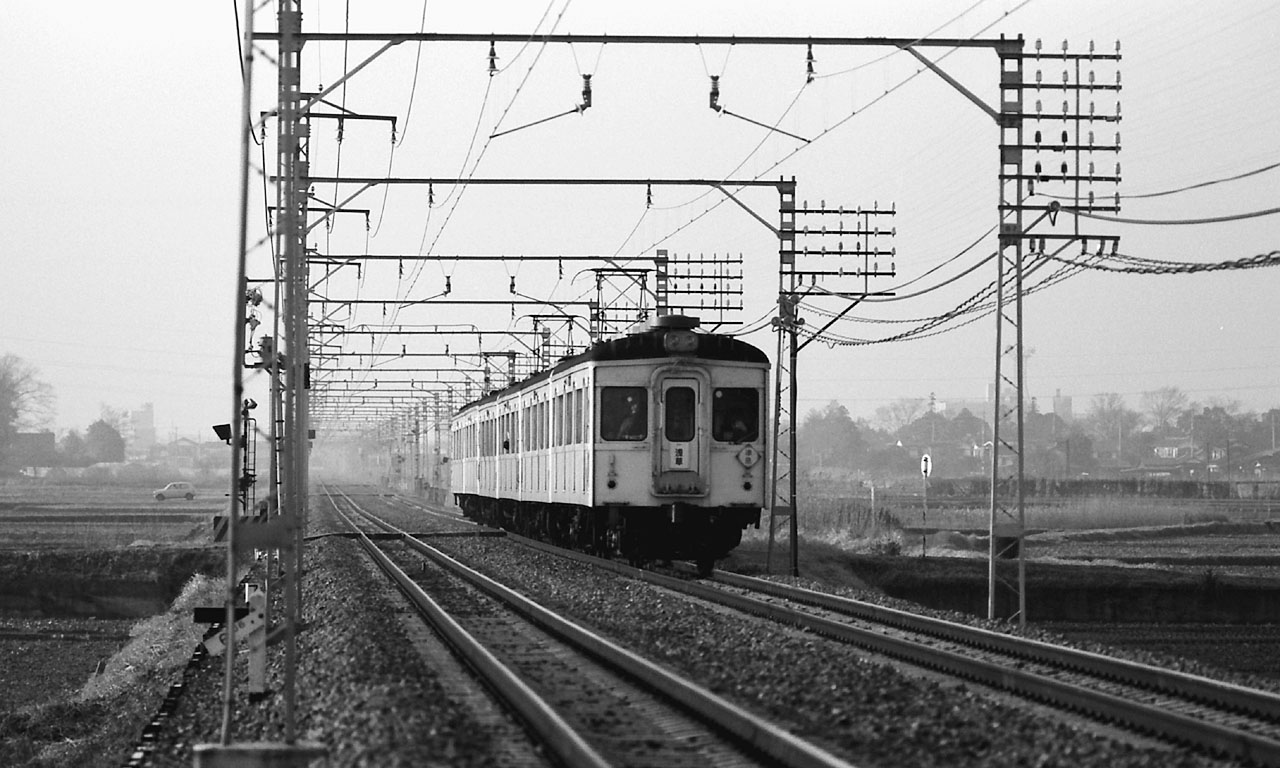
7300 series (Isesaki Line) in 1977

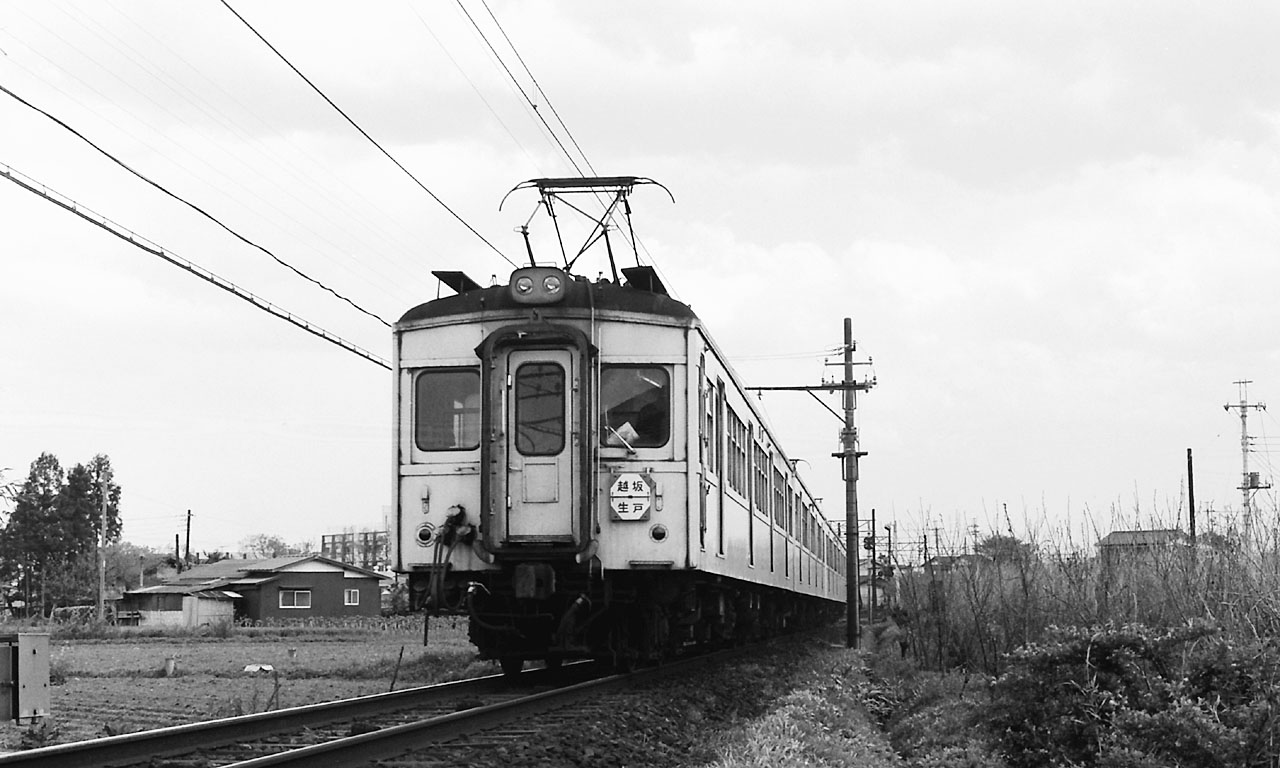
7800 series (Ogose Line) in April 1977

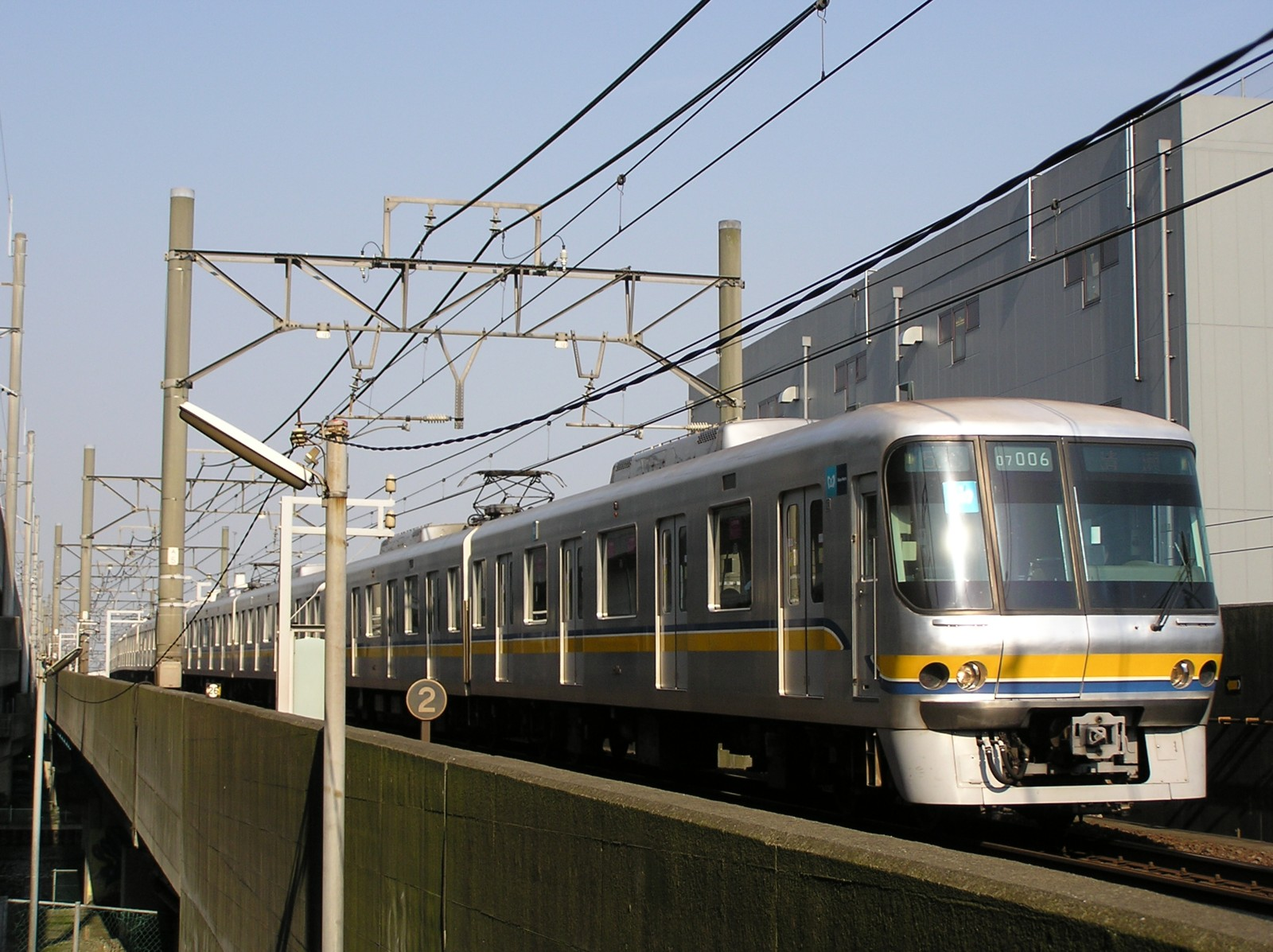
Tokyo Metro 07 series

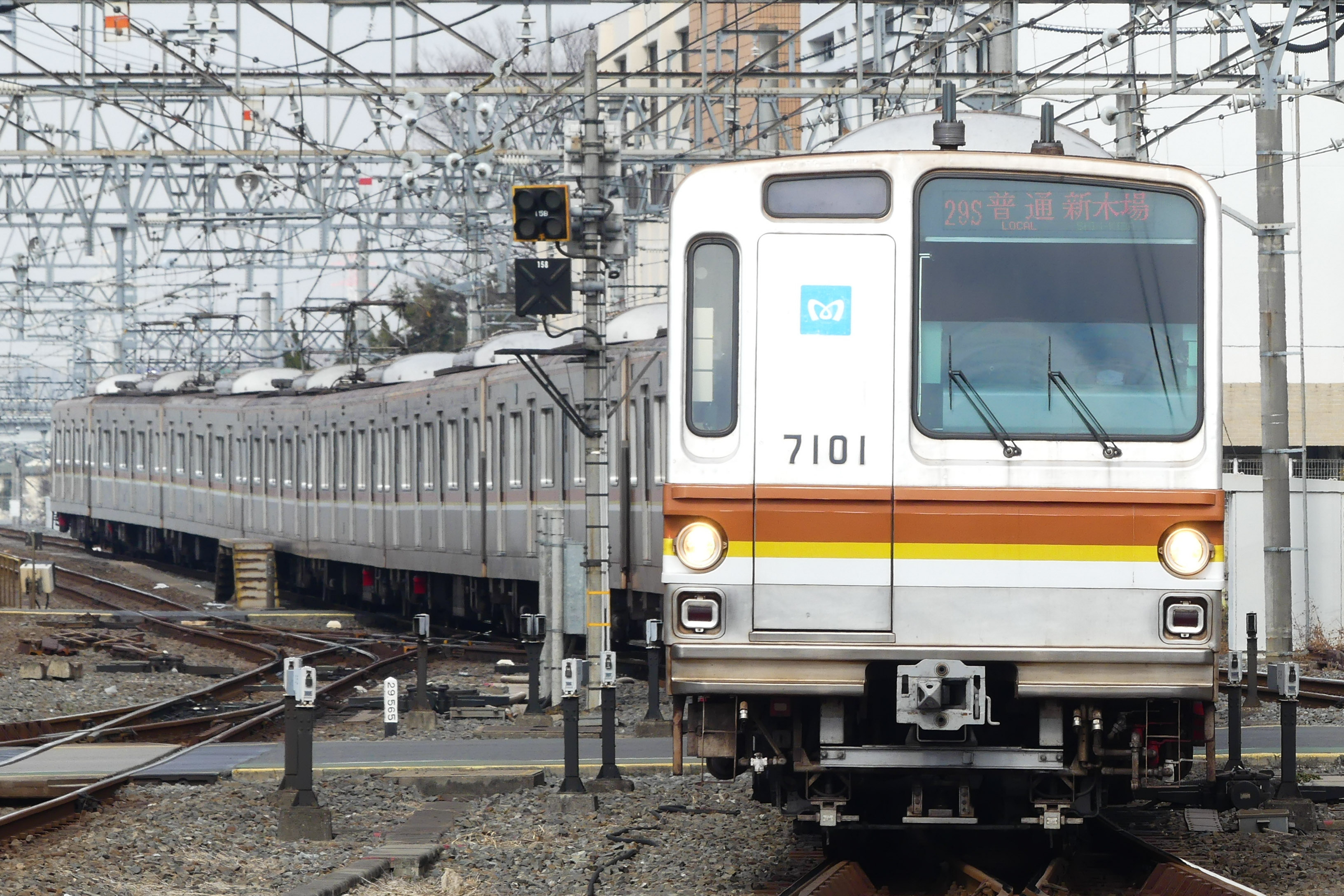
Tokyo Metro 7000 series

== Rolling stock depots ==
The main maintenance depot for the line is Shinrin-kōen Depot, to the north of Shinrin-kōen Station. This opened in March 1971, and as of December 2013 has an allocation of 678 vehicles (the entire fleet used on the Tojo Line and Ogose Line). A smaller maintenance depot is also located at Kawagoe, on the south side of Kawagoeshi Station. This was the main maintenance depot from the time the line first opened in 1914 until the larger facility at Shinrin-kōen was built in 1971. Kawagoe Depot still carries out lighter maintenance and inspection duties. A stabling yard is located to the south of Shimo-Itabashi Station. Built in 1935, this is capable of stabling eight 10-car trains, and is used for stabling trains close to Ikebukuro outside the peak hours.

== Crew operation ==
The line is operated by two-person crews (except for the section between Ogawamachi and Yorii, which is one-person operated). Crews report to either Shiki, Kawagoeshi, or Shinrin-kōen stations. Mainline crew changeovers take place in Ikebukuro Station, Wakōshi Station, Kawagoeshi Station, or Shinrin-kōen Station. Changeovers at Wakōshi are only for through trains from Tokyo Metro lines, where Tobu Railway and Tokyo Metro crews change each other. Crews may have to travel by scheduled trains in order to reach a handover point, particularly crews picking up trains in Wakōshi, or Shiki crews. Handovers in Ikebukuro are to facilitate short turnaround times while allowing crews to take brief breaks.

== History ==
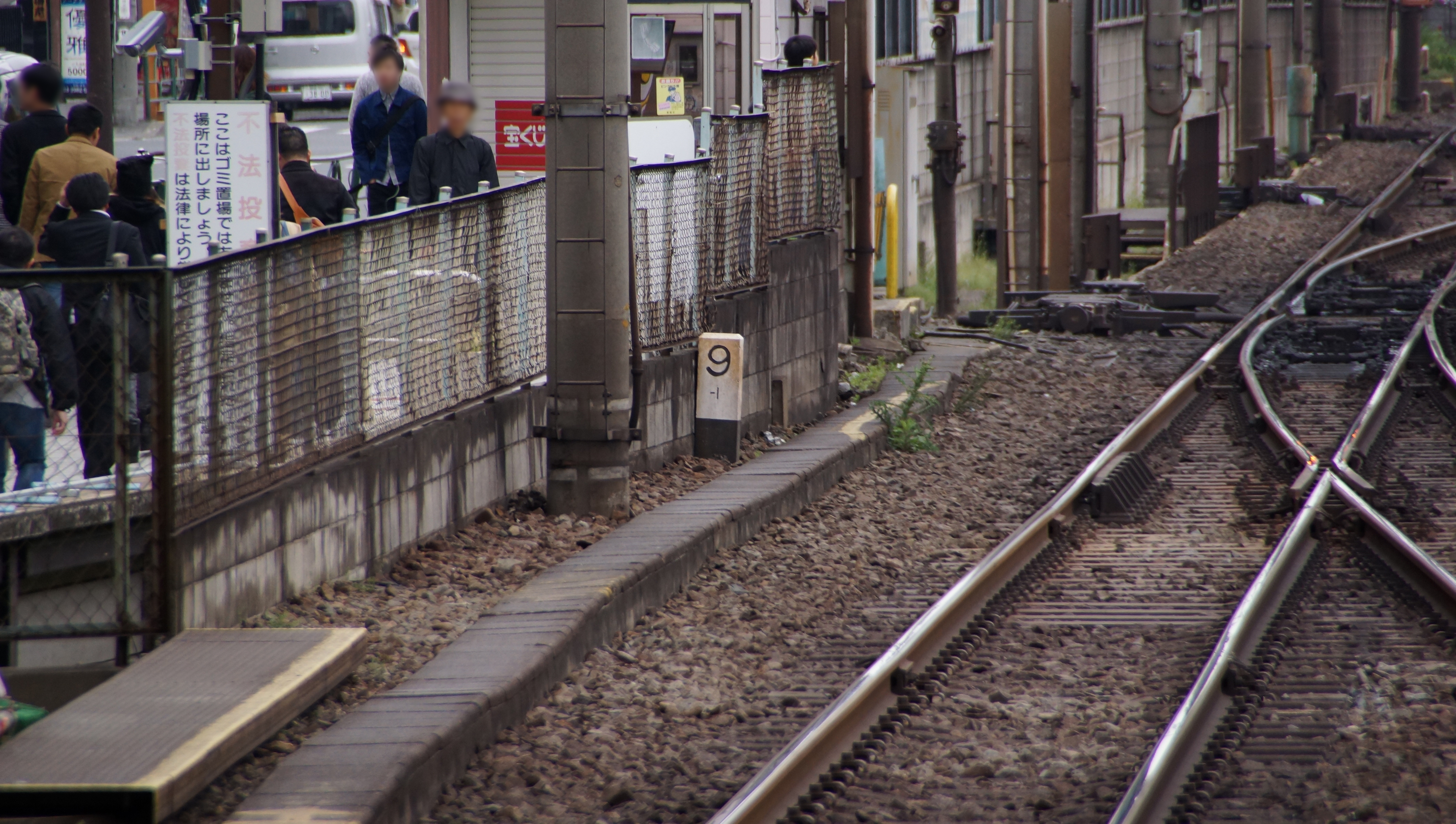
The "-1.9" kilometre post just outside the station

On 1 May 1914, the Tojo Railway (東上鉄道, Tōjō Tetsudō) opened the 33.5 km (20.8 mi) section between Ikebukuro and Tanomosawa (田面沢駅) (located between the present stations of Kawagoeshi and Kasumigaseki). The Tokyo terminus of the line was originally planned to be at Shimo-Itabashi (下板橋駅), and this is where, even today, the "0 km" post for the line is located (with Ikebukuro Station marked by km post "-1.9"). The section from Shimo-Itabashi to Ikebukuro was initially treated as a light railway extension of the main line. Two years later, the line was extended 9.2 km (5.7 mi) from Kawagoemachi (now Kawagoeshi) to Sakadomachi (now Sakado), and at the same time, the section between Kawagoemachi and Tanomosawa was abandoned.

In 1920, the Tojo Railway was absorbed into the Tobu Railway, and in 1923, the line was extended 13.4 km (8.3 mi) from Sakadomachi to Ogawamachi. In 1925, the line was further extended 10.9 km (6.8 mi) from Ogawamachi to Yorii, completing the present-day Tobu Tojo Line. While the original plan had been to extend the line as far as Gunma Prefecture, the connection at Yorii did at least allow for through operations via the Chichibu Railway.

The line from Ikebukuro to Yorii was electrified in October 1929. The 10.9 km (6.8 mi) Ogose Line from Sakadomachi to Ogose was not opened until much later, in 1943. With the steadily growing population along the line, trains were gradually increased in length to the maximum 10 cars seen today, and the original single track was doubled and even quadrupled in some places (between Wakōshi and Shiki). The line from Ikebukuro to Yorii covers a total distance of 75.0 km (46.6 mi).

The Ikebukuro to Shiki section was double-tracked between 1935 and 1937, extended to Kawagoe in 1954, to Higashi-Matsuyama between 1965 and 1968, to Shinrin-kōen in 1977, and to Musashi-Ranzan between 2002 and 2005.

In 1949, Flying Tojo limited express services commenced, running between Ikebukuro and Nagatoro (長瀞駅) on the Chichibu Railway, initially using 5310 series EMUs with transverse seating, and taking approximately two hours. The name was inspired by the Flying Scotsman express train service running in Britain. This service continued until December 1967. Steam for freight haulage on the line was finally withdrawn in 1959.

Freight services ceased in 1986. In 1987, the Yurakucho Line reached Wakōshi, allowing through-running from Kawagoeshi on the Tobu Tojo Line to the then terminus of Shintomichō (later extended further east to the present terminus of Shinkiba).

=== November 1993 timetable revision ===
- Fujimino station opens. Interchange between Express and Semi-express trains moved from Kawagoeshi to Fujimino.

=== March 1998 timetable revision ===
- Express services make an additional stop at Asakadai.

=== March 2005 timetable revision ===
(From 17 March 2005)

- Express trains extended from Musashi-Ranzan to Ogawamachi following completion of double-tracking
- Limited express trains terminated at Ogawamachi (rather than Yorii). Standardized as 10 cars, and include stop at Wakōshi.
- Driver-only operation starts on Ogawamachi to Yorii section. All trains are 4 cars.

=== June 2008 timetable revision ===
From the start of the revised timetable on 14 June 2008, new limited-stop evening TJ Liner services commenced using new 50090 series rolling stock. Six down services operate on weekdays, with four at weekends. Trains from Ikebukuro stop at Fujimino, Kawagoe, Kawagoeshi, Sakado, Higashi-Matsuyama, and Shinrin-kōen, with some services continuing to Ogawamachi stopping at Tsukinowa and Musashiranzan stations. Limited Express services were discontinued and replaced by new Rapid Express (快速急行) services. Daytime express services were increased from four to five per hour, and semiexpress services were reduced from four to three per hour. All trains operating out of Ikebukuro are standardized as 10-car trains. From this date, the maximum line speed was increased from 100 km/h (60 mph) to 105 km/h (65 mph).

=== March 2011 timetable revision ===
From the start of the revised timetable on 5 March 2011, TJ Liner services were increased from six to nine on weekday evenings. The irregularly spaced daytime express services were adjusted to run at 12-minute intervals, and semi-express services were adjusted to run at 20-minute intervals.

From 17 March 2012, station numbering was introduced on all Tobu lines. Tobu Tojo Line and Ogose Line stations were numbered prefixed with the letters "TJ".

From 10 September 2012, 10-car 5050-4000 series sets entered revenue service on the Tobu Tojo Line, with inter-running through to the Tokyo Metro Fukutoshin Line.

=== March 2013 timetable revision ===
From the start of the revised timetable on 16 March 2013, through running via the Tokyo Metro Fukutoshin Line was extended beyond Shibuya over the Tokyu Toyoko Line and Minatomirai Line to Motomachi-Chukagai in Yokohama. New "Rapid" services were introduced, with the previous daytime off-peak pattern of five Express services hourly changed to four Express and two Rapid services per hour in each direction.

=== March 2016 timetable revision ===
Following the revised timetable introduced on 26 March 2016, through services to and from Motomachi-Chukagai in Yokohama, running via the Tokyo Metro Fukutoshin Line were extended to Shinrin-kōen, and upgraded to "Express" status, branded as "F Liner". Weekday morning TJ Liner services were introduced in the up direction to Ikebukuro. Morning Commuter Express (通勤急行, Tsūkin-kyūkō) services were discontinued from this date.

=== March 2019 timetable revision ===
Following the revised timetable introduced on 16 March 2019, a new service type named Kawagoe Limited Express (川越特急, Kawagoe-tokkyu) has begun operation. These trains will use special 50090 series rolling stock nicknamed "Ikebukuro・Kawagoe Art Train (池袋・川越アートトレイン)", with full transverse seating, and with unique Kawagoe-themed external wrapping, designed by Koyano Yuuki, a famous young artist. Passengers will be able to board them without paying an additional Limited Express charge. These trains aim to further establish the notation that "Sightseeing in Kawagoe = Tobu Tojo Line", and to increase convenience of travelling to Kawagoe for residents and visitors.

There are 2 northbound, 4 southbound services on weekends, and 2 northbound, 3 southbound services on weekdays. Services stop at Ikebukuro, Asakadai, Kawagoe, Kawagoe-shi, Sakado and all stations between Higashi-Matsuyama and Ogawamachi. In comparison to the former Limited Express service which was discontinued in 2008, the Kawagoe Limited Express skips Wakoshi and stops at Asakadai.

=== March 2023 timetable revision ===
Along with the opening of the Tōkyū Shin-Yokohama Line and Sōtetsu Shin-Yokohama Line on 18 March 2023, rapid (快速, Kaisoku) services, which were introduced in 2013, were abolished on the Tōjō Line. The same timetable revision also saw Kami-Itabashi Station being added to semi-express services. Rapid express trains now stop at Asakadai instead of Shiki and stop all stations northwest of Kawagoe whilst being the new service type of F-Liner trains, replacing the previous express service type. Express trains now make an additional stop at Asaka. TJ Liner trains towards Ikebukuro also operate on weekends & public holidays. Kawagoe limited express trains now have increased frequency in operation whilst a notable amount of inbound evening services operate from Ogawamachi to Ikebukuro whereas all inbound trains start from Shinrin-kōen prior to the timetable revision.

== See also ==
- List of railway lines in Japan
