= Tjay =

Tjay may refer to:

== Ancient Egypt ==
- An alias for Ramsesnakht, an overseer of a harim within Ancient Egypt
- Ramessesnakht, both individuals dated to a similar reign, 19th and 20th Dynasty)
- The name of a scribe active in ancient Egypt

== Music ==
- Another name for the musician French Montana - not to be confused with Tjay (848)
- Lil Tjay (born 2001), American rapper

== See also ==
- TJ (disambiguation)
- Tee Jay (1962–2006), Ghanaian-British boxer
- Tejay (disambiguation)
