= T. J. Wilson =

T. J. Wilson may refer to:

- Tyson Kidd (born 1980), Canadian wrestler, also known as TJ Wilson
- T. J. Wilson (boxer) (born 1975), American boxer
