= T. J. Campbell =

T. J. Campbell may refer to:

- Thomas Jefferson Campbell (1786–1850), U.S. congressman from Tennessee
- Thomas Joseph Campbell (1872–1946), Irish politician, newspaper editor and judge
- Terrance Campbell (born 1988) American basketball player
