= T. J. Jackson =

T. J. Jackson may refer to:

- T. J. Jackson (wide receiver) (1943–2007), American football wide receiver
- T. J. Jackson (singer) (born 1978), American singer and member of 3T
- T. J. Jackson (defensive tackle) (born 1983), American football defensive tackle
- Thomas Jonathan Jackson, more commonly known as Stonewall Jackson

== See also ==
- T. J. Jackson Lears (born 1947), American historian
