= Mintuci =

Creature from Ainu mythology

The mintuci (Ainu ミントゥチ; also mintuci kamuy, also transliterated into Japanese as mintsuchi (ミンツチ)) is a water sprite or an aquatic supernatural creature, a half-man-half-beast, told in stories of Ainu mythology and folklore. It is also considered a variant of the kappa and, therefore, a type of yōkai.

== Nomenclature ==
The name is mintuci (Ainu: ミントゥチ) according to modern Ainu orthography, but it is also commonly spelled mintsuchi (ミンツチ) in folkloric study literature written in Japanese. (Note: The romanization mintsūchi[?] (ミンツゥチ) is also attested in a Taisho-era paper.)

=== Definitions ===
The mintuci has been defined as "fabulous animal", purported to be "half human and half animal and to inhabit lakes and rivers" in the Ainu dictionary c. 1900 compiled by British missionary John Batchelor. (Note: Batchelor (2nd ed., 1905) romanized as mintuchi, but modern standard romanization of the Ainu is mintuci as stated.) But he also contrived it as a type of water spirit, (Note: Prof. Ishikawa makes the problematic claim, directly quoting from Batchelor's "glossaries" (dictionary) and (mis)translating "fabulous animal" as "spiritual being" (霊物). This is more accurately translated by Takamisawa as "legendary animal" (伝説上の動物). Prof. Ishikawa's claim can still be justified however, since Batchelor's dictionary adds that mintuci is a type of "mermaid", and elsewhere he is seen applying "mermaid" as the English shortand for pe-boso-koshimpuk (sic.), where koshimp[uk] means 'fairy/demon' (viz. infra); Batchelor also explains mintuci to be the Ainu name for a "water nymph", and a nymph is of course commonly seen as a spirit or minor deity.) and stated it was considered by the Ainu to be a type of "koshimpuk" (normalized spelling: kosimpuk, kosimpu), which is a word glossed as meaning 'fairy' or 'daemon'.

Others characterize it as a yōkai, closely akin to the kappa, but others point out that there are legends peculiar to the Ainu attached to the mintuci, not seen in kappa legends.

=== Etymology ===
The Ainu word mintuci is considered to be borrowed from the Japanese word mizuchi (or variants thereof), that are local appellations for the kappa, ultimately deriving from the term mizuchi, which signifies a type of dragon. (Note: While Takamisawa links mintuci with the mizuchi dragon, the source she invokes (Sakurai) only connects mizushi, medochi etc., (local Japanese terms for kappa, not the Ainu term) with the mizuchi dragon. The hypothesis that the northeastern name medochi for a kappa derived from the mizuchi dragon was already anticipated by Kumagusu Minakata in his essay concerning the year of the snake (1917), which was an installment in his zodiacal series Jūnishi kō.)

However, Batchelor has given a strictly Ainu etymology for mintuci, explaining it as a compound of mimi (or mim) meaning 'flesh' and tumunci (トゥームーンチー) meaning 'devil'.

=== Synonyms ===
According to some Ainu elders, mintuci was a name that people on the Japanese mainland used to refer to kappa, and the correct Ainu term was Shiri-sham-ainu (シリシャマイヌ), literally denoting a "mountain-side-person". Its bald-headedness and reference to the mountainside suggest a hypothetical connection to, or conflation with, the generic Japanese mountain deity, the Yama-no-Kami.

The name manifests local variation, and the creature is called mimtuci (ミムトゥチ) in the Chitose dialect and mintoci (ミントチ) in the Ishikari region.

The creature is known by the name hundoci (フンドチ) or slight variants thereof in the Tokachi and Kurshiro regions. (Note: Known as hunduci (フンヅゥチ) among the Ainu of Fushikobetsu (伏古別; now Obihiro).) It is said to make an occasional grunting noise like "hunn (フンッ)", according to the folklore of the town of Ikeda in the eastern part of the Tokachi Plain, where the hundoci appears in the guise of a diminutive old person of indeterminate gender.

The kappa of the Ainu may otherwise be called "mintoci kamuy, nintoci kamuy, or huntoci kamuy". (Note: Here quoting the examples given by Genzō Sarashina in his notes to his collected tale "kappa wo yaita hai [The ashes of a burnt-up kappa]", but in this particular tale, it is the fiendish creature mosir-sinnaysam which is labeled as a kappa as a shorthand name.)

== Folklore ==
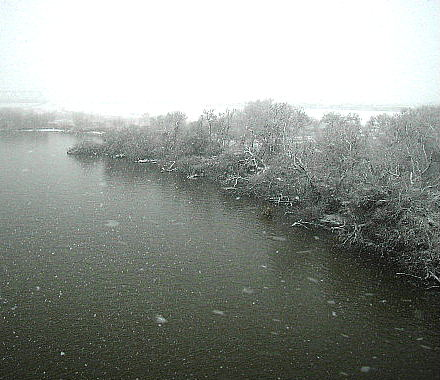
Ishikari River, Hokkaido, where some of the mintuci legends are set

The mintuci are reputed to be of the height and stature of a 3-year-old to a 12-year-old or 13-year-old human. It has a head of hair without a "plate" like the kappa (though having fleshy, bald patches on their heads (Note: This fleshy head gave rise to its name, meaning "flesh[y] devil" according to Batchelor.)), and though they may be bald, the males and females can still be distinguished, or so it has been told in the tale where the mintuci appears in the Ishikari River. (Note: This description of a bald kappa (nintoci kamuy) of Ishikari River occurs in the tale where a youth from the kotan (village) of Chikapuni sets out to journey the way downstream this river to Yūbetsu. The kappa predicts that the Yūbetsu people will be loth to comply with the youth's mission (return of a loaned treasure), and will persuade him to embark on a perilous search for the eggs of the giant bird huri kamuy, but the youth is protected by a small bag amulet and succeeds in winning its feather.)

Its skin is purplish or reddish, with sea turtle-like texture, and they have either bird-like feet or four sets of hooves, with one supposed witness discovering sickle-like footprints. (Note: Discovered by a person named Itonbiya from the hamlet of Nioi (荷負, now a district or aza within the town of Biratori, Hokkaido), who found the sickle-like prints at a spot named Abushi (also within Biratori).) There also exists an oral tradition that both its arms are attached, so that tugging one arm makes the other become shorter, or pulling on one arm hard enough will cause both arms to be ripped out; however, this curious anatomical lore may not be original, since it is told of the kappa in some regions of Japan.

The mintuci are said to hunt people and livestock by dragging them underwater, but this prankishness is also a trait frequently ascribed to the kappa, cf. the motif of the kappa komabiki ("the water-imp dragging a horse into the water").

People may also become possessed by the mintuci, and women possessed by one may attempt to seduce men. According to a legend circulating in Kushiro, on a foggy nights, a victim may detect what seems to be human presence that has abruptly appeared ahead of him, and trying to engage this entity in conversation will go unanswered; it continues to walk onward until the victim notices the odd bird-like footprints, and just then the mintuci's shadow would vanish and come around from behind, dragging the victim into the water.

=== Benefactor or menace ===
Although the mintuci is generally considered an "evil dispositioned" type of fabulous aquatic creature, reputed to "disembowel and devour human beings when they catch them", there are also benevolent types called pirika mintuci (lit. "good mintuci") which inhabit the mountains according to John Batchelor.

It is not strictly just the mountain type which assists humans (bringing bounty of the mountain, i.e., luck of hunting), because the aquatic mintuci are also known to help (bestow bounties of the waters, i.e., luck in fishing). There are also dangerous consequences when the mountain mintuci is crossed, as detailed below:

As the mintuci is a deity which controls the fish, it may bring luck to fishermen, but at a price, because as long as it is present, it will be responsible for an increase in deaths by drowning. In an anecdote set in the Ishikari region, the mintuci allowed a bountiful catch of fish, but it was sure to take several lives each year, so that the people begged it to move elsewhere to the town of Shizunai in Hidaka (now incorporated into the town of Shinhidaka, Hokkaido), and as a result, the drownings ceased, but the fish catch plummeted afterwards. In another tale, a mintuci becomes the adopted husband and comes to live with the bride's family in the hamlet of Chikabumi in Asahikawa. He brought about a rich harvest of fish, but was discovered to be the cause of increased river drownings, so he was expelled and thereafter moved to the Shibichari River (in the town of Shizunai). The prosperity of Asahikawa and the Saru River was attributed to the mintuci's protection.

The mintuci also blesses the hunter, rewarding him with game in plenitude according to folk tradition. According to one piece of lore, the chieftain of the mintuci is called mintuci-tono, (Note: Normalized as ミントゥチトノ, though the original paper gives ミンツゥチトノ.) and he is a bearer of bow and arrows, known to aid humans in need, or give the gift of bow and arrows, but in return demands offering of sake or hei type ornaments, and people are obliged to comply. However, the ornament in question should not be the inaw usually offered to the gods; it should be a more simplified version. (Note: The motif of requiring a more meagre inaw (Ainu: nitne inaw, translated "hard inaw"Ōtani (2016), p. 71 also translatable as "shabby inaw") is also recorded in the oral tale recited by Ms. Ueda.)

The mintuci is thought capable of transforming into a youth and becoming an adopted husband at a home with only daughters, bringing about fortune and luck of the hunt, but once the village incurs his wrath, he will depart, absconding with the community's food spirit, causing famine. There are tales of the mintuci acting as guardians for humans in the Asahikawa and Saru River areas. In one tale set in the Saru River, a mintuci who helped the chieftain carry his load demanded a banquet afterwards, rewarding his hosts with a golden tobacco case (金の煙草入) said to be an amulet of protection from night raids. When another village attacked, those who participated in providing hospitality to the spirit were intact, but those who failed to come to the gathering all lost their lives. The motif of the golden tobacco case amulet as a gift also occurs in a variant tale entitled "Kappa no hanashi", where the benefactor is the kappa-deity or nintoci kamuy.

=== Origin tale ===
According to one origin myth, (Note: Miura (2002), p. 119 specifies this as an origin tale (kigen tan); cited by Fujita.) long ago, during the epoch when the god Okikurumi descended on earth and ruled over the Ainu (human) world, there came far from the sea the smallpox divinity known to the Ainu as Patum-kamui (パツムカムイ), and many succumbed to the disease. Okikurmi then created a set of 61 Chishinap-kamui (Ti-sinap-kamuy (Note: Normalized spelling. "Chi-shinap-kamui" is the romanization that Kindaichi used.) (Note: These are otherwise known as noya-imos-kamuy (ノヤイモシカムイ; lit. 'mugwort magic-imbued god[s]').)) made by braiding mugworts (Note: In Japanese writers refer to the Japanese plant name yomogi but this generally implies Artemesia princeps, when the Ainu refers to the noya as in (noya-kamuy), the word noya without any qualification is assumed to designate a different plant whose Japanese name is ezo-yomogi or ōyomogi, A. montana.) into a cross shape, breathing life into them to fight the smallpox divinity/demon. All but one of the puppets drowned, and the grand general who remained managed to defeat the smallpox demon. The puppets that drowned thereafter became the mintuci kamuy, helping people in case of illness or adversity.

A (less mythologized) and historical folk tradition blames the arrival of the pox on Japanese traders and their merchant ships. (Note: There is historical basis to this, as it has been pointed out, that the bezaisen boats habitually forced the crewmen who presented with smallpox symptoms off board and abandoned them on Ainu territory, which led to epidemics. (Nihon mukashibanashi tsūkan, 1, tale 46). Although this commentary is on the smallpox deity, and does not touch on the mintuci per se.) According to tradition, the Smallpox Deity (smallpox demon) sneaked onto the bezaisen boats, which the Japanese sailed into Hokkaido to establish trade relations with the Ainu during the Edo period. A smallpox outbreak killed many Ainu. And this led to the custom of creating the weed dolls for protection from this disease, namely, the Ti-sinap-kamuy, which a god did not invent, but by the Ainu people. In fact, the literal meaning of Ti-sinap-kamuy is 'god whom we bundled/bound'.

== See also ==
- Kamuy
- Kami
- Wight
- Kappa
- Nixie
- Naiad
