= Kaisen =

Kaisen may refer to:

== People ==
- Kaisen Joki (快川紹喜, 1500–1582), Japanese Buddhist monk
- Jane Jin Kaisen (born 1980), Korean-Danish visual artist and filmmaker
- Olivier Kaisen (born 1983), Belgian cyclist
- Wilhelm Kaisen (1887–1979), German politician

== Other uses ==
- Kaisen (circuit ship), a Japanese ship
- Kaisen: Outbreak, a Japanese professional wrestling event
- Kaisen Linux, a Linux distribution

== See also ==
- Jujutsu Kaisen, a Japanese manga series
- Kaizen, a Japanese business term
