= Tarukaisen =

Tarukaisen (Japanese: 樽廻船) were cargo vessels primarily designed for transporting sake in barrels, though they sometimes carried other goods. They traveled from Osaka to Edo. These vessels were propelled by a single sail and featured strengthened hulls to support the barrels they carried.

== See also ==
- Kitamaebune
- Atakebune
- Red seal ships
- Takasebune
- Ohama Kagetaka
