= Naniwa Maru =

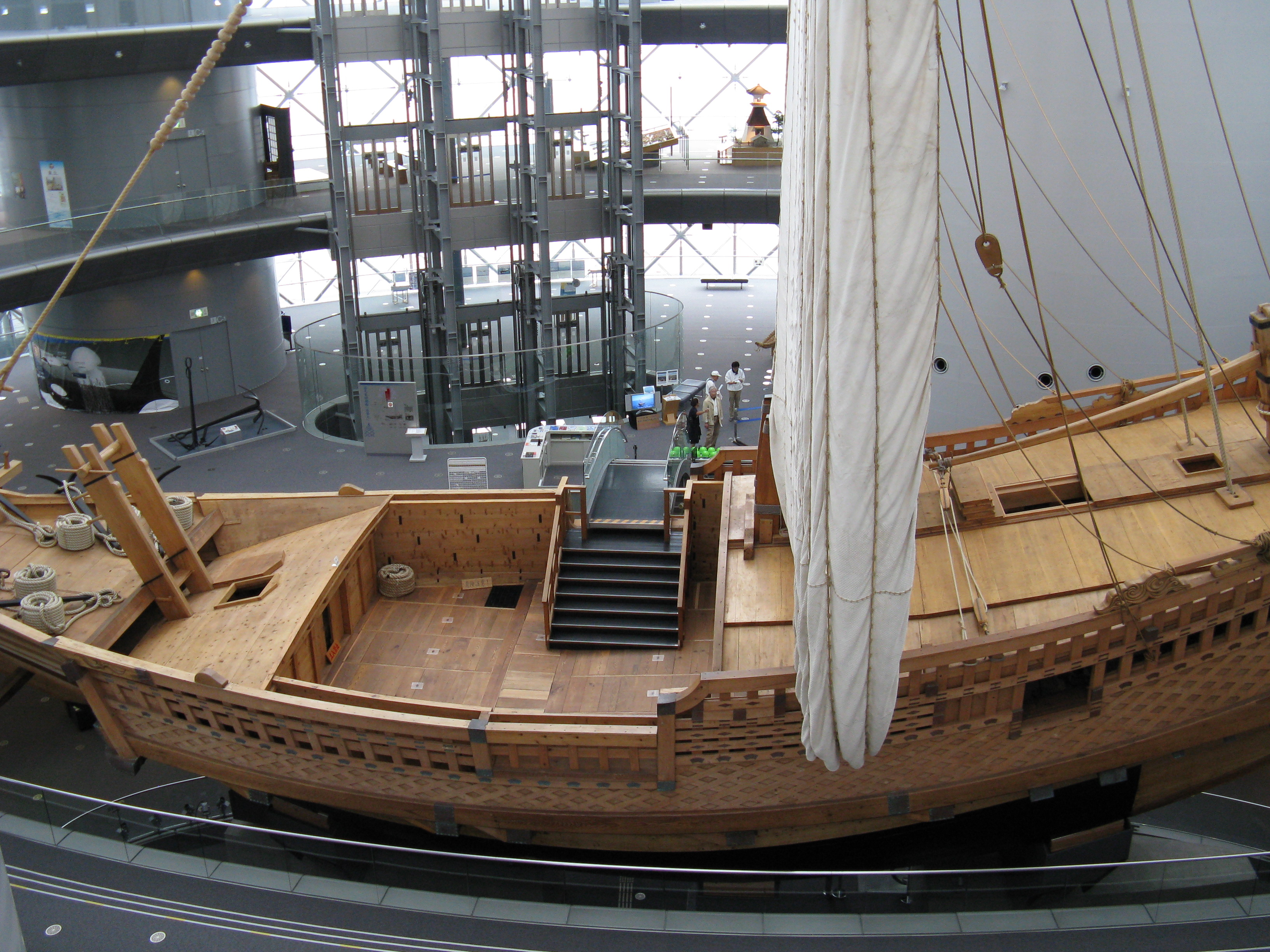
- The Naniwa Maru inside the Osaka Maritime Museum

History
- Name: Naniwa Maru; 浪華丸
- Builder: Hitachi Zosen
- Maiden voyage: 1999

General characteristics
- Tonnage: 90 T
- Length: 30 m
- Beam: 7.4 m
- Height: 27.50 m
- Propulsion: Sail

The Naniwa Maru (浪華丸) is a replica ship of a typical Japanese trader from the Edo period (1603–1868) known as a higaki kaisen. It was built as the main exhibit for the Osaka Maritime Museum, with academic interest which also encouraged sea based testing until it was transferred into the newly built museum.

== History ==
Higaki kaisen were cargo ships. During the Edo period they were used to transport basic materials between Osaka and Edo (now Tokyo), up the coast. Materials transported included vinegar, cotton, oil, paper and medicines. They were used by Sakai merchants, and were similar to the Kaisen (circuit ship).

== Naming ==
The name Naniwa Maru comes from the ancient name for Osaka - Naniwa, and the usual postfix given to Japanese trading vessels, Maru. The type of ship, higaki kaisen (菱垣廻船), originates in the name of the rhomboid-shaped bamboo gunwales, higaki, which helped keep the goods on deck, and kaisen, or "coastal boat".

== Construction ==
The plans for the ship were drawn up on computer, based on the only remaining original drawings dating back to the Bunka epoch (1804–1817). The ship has a length of 30m, is 27.5m high, with a breadth of 7.4m and weighs 90t.

The ship uses a number of different woods in its construction, just as the original ships would have done. Pine, cedar, Japanese cypress and evergreen oak are all used in the construction of the hull and mast, whilst the sail is a cotton canvas known as a matsuemon-ho and there are old Japanese-style nails such as nuikugi and toshikugi.

== Sea trials ==
Sea trials were conducted in Osaka Bay between 20 July and 1 August 1999, the first sea trials of a replica ship in Japan. These were run under the supervision of Nomoto Kensaku, emeritus professor at Osaka University, and helped confirm theories on the efficacy of the single-mast, square sail design.

== See also ==
- Kitamaebune
- Atakebune
- Red seal ships
- Takasebune
- Ohama Kagetaka
