= Bezaisen =

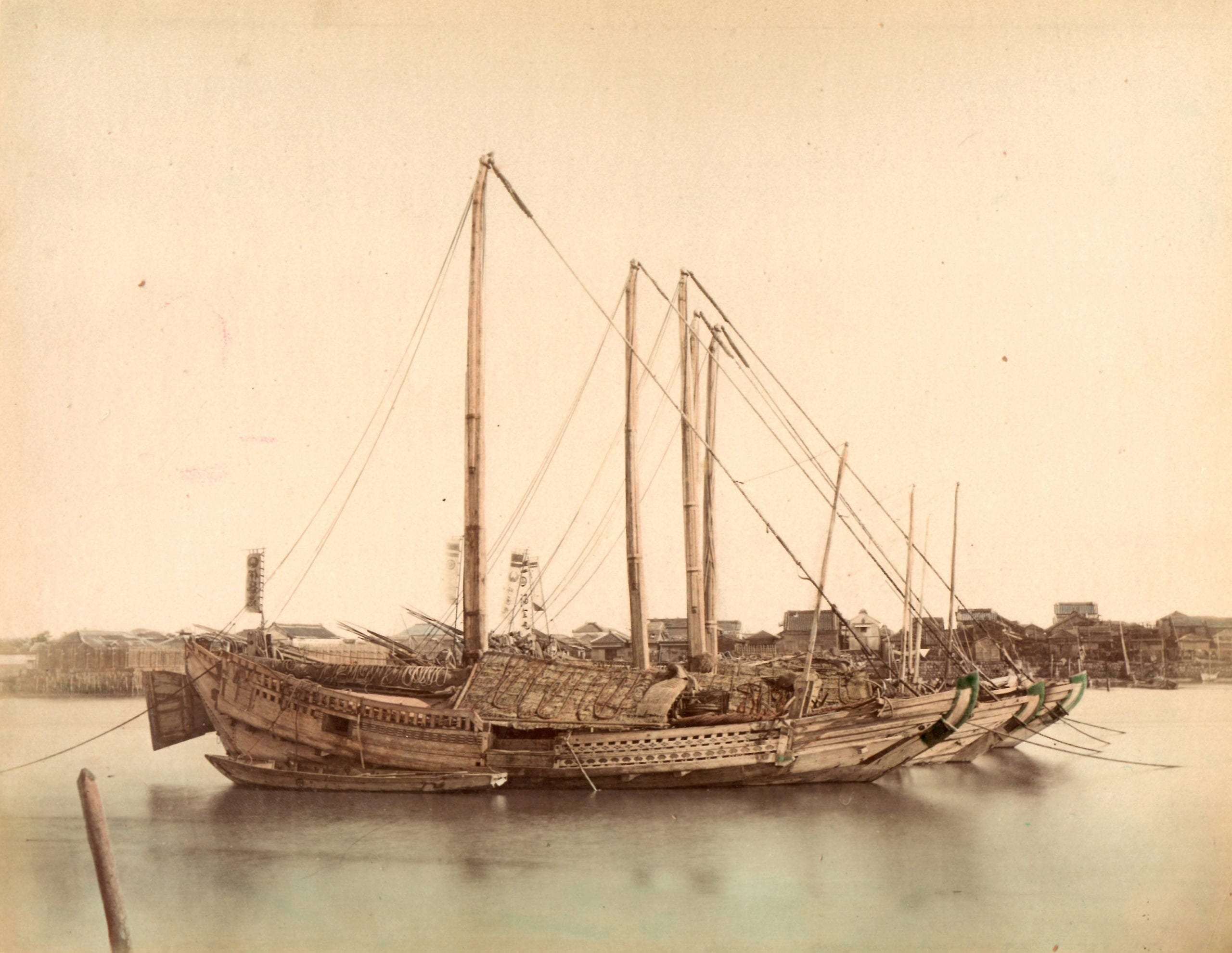
- Bezaisen Japanese ship

The Bezaisen (Japanese: 弁才船) or Benzaisen was a large wooden sailing ship that was widely used for domestic shipping in Japan through the Edo and Meiji periods.

== Name ==
Several theories exist regarding the origin of the name Benzai-sen. Folklorists Kunio Yanagita and Tarō Wakamori proposed that it derives from the Bensai-shi (弁済使), officials engaged in the management of maritime transport and delivery. Another theory from the Edo period held that “Bezai” (ベザイ) derived from Heizai (平在), meaning “stable presence,” referring to the ship’s good balance and seaworthiness. A further explanation suggests it evolved from Hezaizen (舳在船), meaning “a ship with a prow.” However, since the term was originally written as “Bezai,” the Bensai-shi theory is doubtful, and the “Heizai” interpretation does not match changes in the vessel’s actual design.

Although the ship type originated in the Seto Inland Sea, the kanji form “弁才船” was first used on the Sea of Japan coast. Sailors serving aboard Benzai-sen were called Benzaishu or Benzaisha.

== Origin ==
Originally, Benzai-sen were small- to medium-sized vessels used within the Seto Inland Sea. In the early modern period, they ranged in capacity from 110 to 960 seki (a seki being roughly 180 litres of rice). Standard capacity was about 250 seki. From the late 17th century, hulls were enlarged to 350 seki and beyond, with ships over 1,000 seki appearing by the late Edo period.

As Benzai-sen became dominant and replaced other vessel types, the term Kaisen (merchant ship) came to refer to them specifically. The colloquial name Sengokubune (“thousand-koku ship”) originally described cargo capacity, but became synonymous with the Benzai-sen as 1,000-seki vessels grew common.

The early Benzai-sen did not differ greatly from Ise-bune or Nikaigata-sen, though its bow was thicker like that of a Sekibune, improving speed and seaworthiness. This advantage led to its dominance in coastal trade.

== Improvements ==
=== Edo-period developments ===
In 1635, the Tokugawa shogunate prohibited the construction of ships over 500 seki (the “Prohibition on Large Shipbuilding”), but ocean-going vessels were exempt. Three years later, merchant ships were again permitted, and with the adoption of the isolation policy, coastal navigation became the primary use of the Benzai-sen.

By the mid-18th century, rationalization made Benzai-sen more efficient. Earlier Kaisen had combined sailing and rowing, but as the economy expanded, competition encouraged full sail propulsion and smaller crews. This innovation helped expand domestic shipping.

Hull structure
Late-Edo Benzai-sen featured thicker planks and higher sides for seaworthiness, with reinforced framing that improved stability and cargo capacity, allowing voyages farther offshore.
Sails
Initially fitted with straw-mat sails, Benzai-sen adopted cotton sails once domestic production expanded. In 1785, shipwright Kuraku Matsuemon invented a stronger woven cotton sail that spread rapidly.
Rigging
Enlarged rudders and adjustable yards improved control, enabling sailing crosswind or partially upwind.
Rudder
Rudders were retractable to suit shallow, undredged ports, but this design sometimes caused stern damage in rough seas.
Winch
The addition of capstans simplified sail handling and cargo loading, reducing labor.

=== Meiji-period developments ===
During the Meiji period, the government termed traditional Japanese sailboats such as Benzai-sen “Yamato-type ships” to distinguish them from Western designs.

Despite the introduction of Western vessels, Benzai-sen remained important for domestic trade due to their economy and simplicity. They incorporated Western elements such as ribbed framing, Western-style rudders, jibs, spankers, and schooner-type rigs. The type remained in service until replaced by motor sailers in the early Shōwa period.

== Performance ==
Benzai-sen were designed for coastal transport rather than open-sea voyages and were smaller than visiting foreign ships.

Contrary to popular belief, the Tokugawa shogunate did not ban decks, keels, or multiple sails. The flat keels, single masts, and simple rigging reduced crew size. Some vessels carried auxiliary sails, and while deckless designs increased cargo capacity, they also made ships more prone to wrecks.

Efforts to improve safety included partial decking and removable side walls (*jabara-gaki*) or awnings (*tsunetoma*) to protect cargo.

=== Typical size ===
A mid-18th-century 1,000-seki Benzai-sen measured about 29 m in length, 7.5 m in beam, and carried around 15 crew with a displacement of roughly 150 tons.

=== Cargo capacity ===
By the 19th century, merchant Benzai-sen reached capacities of 1,400–1,800 seki, with a few exceeding 2,000 seki. Cargo capacity was expressed in rice equivalents, and ship size was estimated using the kata-mawashi formula based on principal dimensions rather than tonnage.

=== Sailing performance ===
In early Edo times, the voyage from Osaka to Edo took over 30 days, but by the Tenpō era (1830s) it averaged 12 days and could be completed in six. Competitive routes, such as the “new cotton” and “new sake” races, achieved speeds of 6–7 knots, rivaling clipper ships.

=== Economy ===
Japanese ships, built from large planks and beams rather than curved ribs, were cheaper than Western vessels. In 1878, a 1,000-seki Benzai-sen cost about ¥2,900 compared with ¥4,600 for a Western ship. Service life averaged 20 years, with major refits every 10–15 years, and some vessels lasted up to 30 years.

== See also ==
- Kitamaebune
- Atakebune
- Red seal ships
- Takasebune
- Ohama Kagetaka
