= Tobu 90000 series =

Japanese electric multiple unit train type

- Set 91003 in October 2026
- In service: 2026–present
- Manufacturer: Hitachi
- Replaced: 9000 series; 10000 series; 30000 series
- Constructed: 2025–
- Entered service: 26 September 2026
- Number under construction: 40 vehicles (4 sets)
- Number built: 30 vehicles (3 sets)
- Formation: 10 cars per trainset
- Fleet numbers: 91001–
- Capacity: 1,390
- Operator: Tobu Railway
- Lines served: Tojo Line; Yūrakuchō Line; Fukutoshin Line; Tōyoko Line; Minatomirai Line

Specifications
- Car body construction: Aluminium, double-skin
- Car length: 20,470 mm (67 ft 2 in) (end cars); 20,000 mm (65 ft 7 in) (intermediate cars)
- Width: 2,780 mm (9 ft 1 in)
- Height: 4,108.3 mm (13 ft 5.74 in)
- Doors: 4 per side
- Maximum speed: 110 km/h (68 mph)
- Weight: 293.5 t (288.9 long tons; 323.5 short tons)
- Traction system: 2-level SiC–VVVF
- Traction motors: TM25 three-phase induction motor
- Acceleration: 3.3 km/(h⋅s) (2.1 mph/s)
- Deceleration: 3.7 km/(h⋅s) (2.3 mph/s) (service); 4.5 km/(h⋅s) (2.8 mph/s) (emergency)
- Electric systems: 1,500 V DC
- Current collection: Overhead lines
- Braking system: Regenerative braking
- Safety systems: T-DATC, CS-ATC, ATO, T-ATS-P, TSP-ATS
- Track gauge: 1,067 mm (3 ft 6 in)

Notes/references
- Specifications

The Tobu 90000 series (東武90000系, Tōbu 90000-kei) is a DC electric multiple unit (EMU) commuter train type operated by the private railway operator Tobu Railway in Japan since 2026. Seven ten-car sets are to be built.

== Design ==
The end cars feature a reverse slant design inspired by the Takasebune boat, with the front ends curving upwards from the lower part of the cars.

== Operations ==
In addition to operating on the Tobu Tojo Line, the 90000 series sets will also be used for through-running services over the Tokyo Metro Yurakucho Line, Tokyo Metro Fukutoshin Line, Tokyu Toyoko Line and Minatomirai Line.

== Formation ==
Sets are formed as shown below with four motored ("M") cars and six non-powered trailer ("T") cars.

Car No.	1	2	3	4	5	6	7	8	9	10
Designation	Tc1	M1	T1	M2	T2	T3	M3	T4	M4	Tc2
Numbering	91000	92000	93000	94000	95000	96000	97000	98000	99000	90000
Capacity (total/seated)	131/45	141/51	141/51	141/51	141/51	141/51	141/51	141/51	141/51	131/45
Weight (t)	29.3	32.3	27.5	32.3	25.0	25.7	32.3	27.5	32.4	29.2

- Cars 2, 4, 7, and 9 each have one single-arm pantograph.
- Each car has an accessible "free space".

== Interior ==
Passenger accommodation consists of longitudinal seating throughout. Pairs of 17-inch LCD passenger information screens are installed above the doorways. LED lighting is used throughout.

Interior

Priority seating

Free space

LCD information screens

== History ==
Details of the new 90000 series trains on order to replace the ageing 9000 series fleet were first announced on 26 March 2025. Tobu states that the 90000 series will consume over 40% less power than the 9000 series. In November 2025, Tobu announced that the 90000 series would also replace 10000 and 30000 series trainsets.

The first set, 91001, was delivered from Hitachi's Kasado Works plant in February 2026.

The 90000 series entered service on 26 September 2026.

=== Build histories ===
The delivery dates for the fleet are as shown below.

Set No.	Date delivered
91001	February 2026
91002	March 2026
91003	April 2026
