= Tobu 30000 series =

Electric multiple unit train type operated by Tobu Railway in Japan

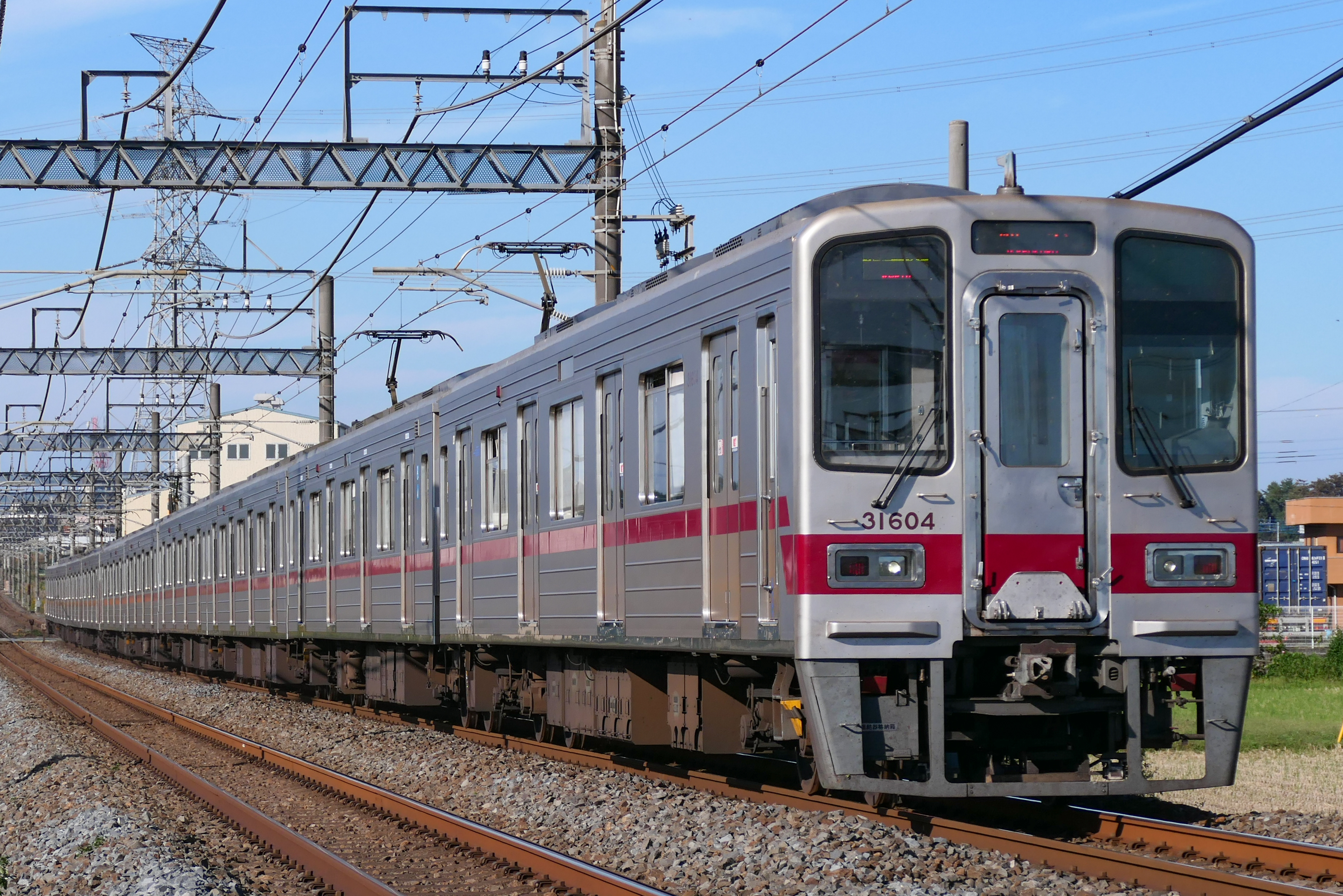
- 30000 series set 31604 in October 2021
- Manufacturers: Alna Kōki, Tokyu Car Corporation, Fuji Heavy Industries
- Constructed: 1996–2003
- Entered service: 1997
- Number built: 150 vehicles (30 sets)
- Number in service: 150 vehicles (16 sets; as of 24 January 2020)
- Formation: 10/6/4 cars per trainset
- Operator: Tobu Railway
- Depots: Kasukabe; Minami-Kurihashi; Shinrinkōen
- Lines served: Tobu Tojo Line; Tobu Skytree Line; Tobu Isesaki Line; Tobu Nikko Line; Tobu Utsunomiya Line; Tokyo Metro Hanzomon Line; Tokyu Den-en-toshi Line

Specifications
- Car body construction: Stainless steel
- Car length: 20 m (65 ft 7 in)
- Doors: 4 pairs per side
- Maximum speed: 120 km/h (75 mph)
- Traction system: Variable frequency (IGBT)
- Traction motors: TM-95 three-phase induction motor
- Power output: 190 kW (250 hp) per motor
- Acceleration: 3.3 km/(h⋅s) (2.1 mph/s) (Note: When operated in multiple with a 10000 series set, acceleration was limited to 2.5 km/(h⋅s) (1.6 mph/s).)
- Deceleration: 3.5 km/(h⋅s) (2.2 mph/s) (service); 4.5 km/(h⋅s) (2.8 mph/s) (emergency)
- Electric system: 1,500 V DC overhead line
- Current collection: Single-arm pantograph
- Bogies: SS138 (motored); SS038 (trailer)
- Braking system: Electronically controlled pneumatic brakes with regenerative braking
- Multiple working: 10000 series
- Headlight type: High-intensity discharge
- Track gauge: 1,067 mm (3 ft 6 in)

Notes/references
- Specification sources

The Tobu 30000 series (東武30000系, Tōbu 30000-kei) is a DC electric multiple unit (EMU) commuter train type operated by the private railway operator Tobu Railway in Japan since 1997. Initially formed as six-car and four-car sets, sets are mostly formed as permanently coupled ten-car formations since 2011.

== Formations ==
As of 24 January 2020, the fleet consists of one six-car and one four-car set based at Minami-Kurihashi and Kasukabe depots for Tobu Skytree Line and Tobu Nikko Line services, and 14 permanently coupled 6+4-car sets based at Shinrinkoen Depot for Tobu Tojo Line services.

=== 10-car Tobu Tojo Line sets ===
Car No.	1	2	3	4	5	6	7	8	9	10
Designation	Tc2	M2A	M1A	T	T	M3	T1	M2	M1	Tc1
Numbering	34400	33400	32400	31400	36600	35600	34600	33600	32600	31600

- The M1 and M1A cars are each fitted with two single-arm pantographs, and the M3 cars are fitted with one.
- Cars 2, 3, 6, and 9 have wheelchair spaces.

=== 6-car sets ===
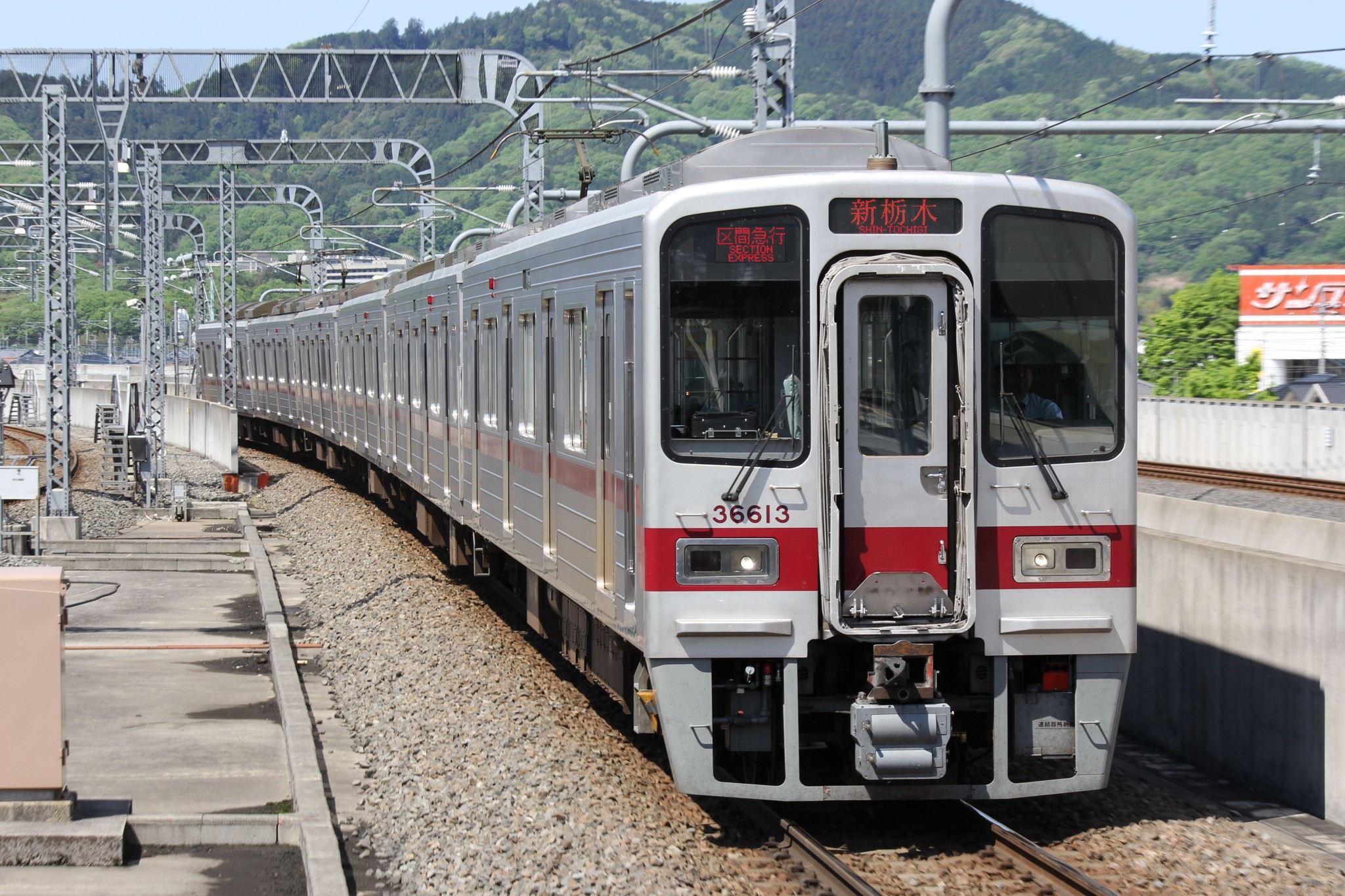
Six-car set 31613 on a Nikko Line service in May 2012

Designation	Tc1	M1	M2	T1	M3	Tc2
Numbering	31600	32600	33600	34600	35600	36600

The M1 cars are fitted with two single-arm pantographs, and the M3 cars are fitted with one.

=== 4-car sets ===
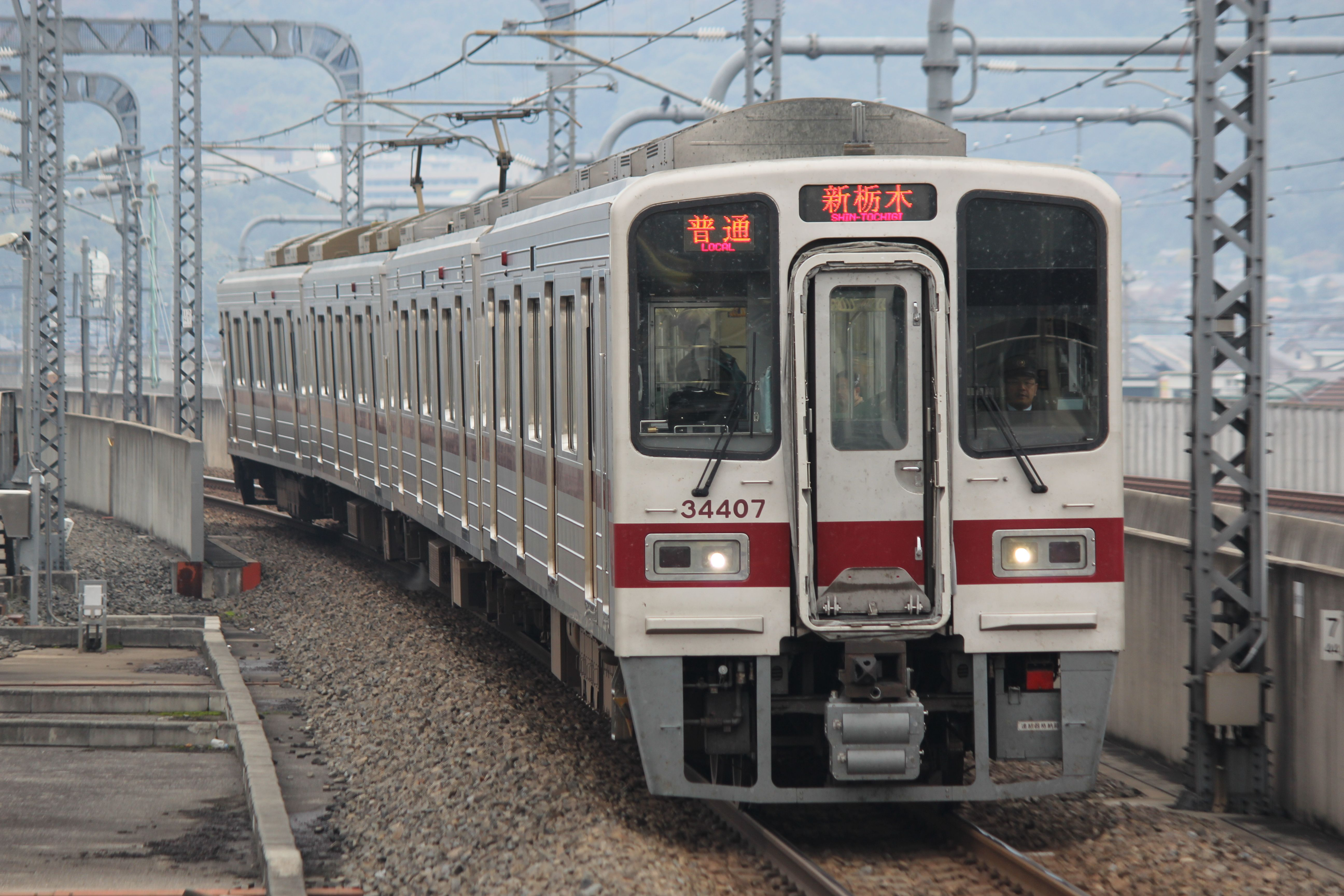
Four-car set 31407 on a Nikko Line service in November 2013

Designation	Tc1	M1A	M2A	Tc2
Numbering	31400	32400	33400	34400

The M1A cars are fitted with two single-arm pantographs.

== Bogies ==
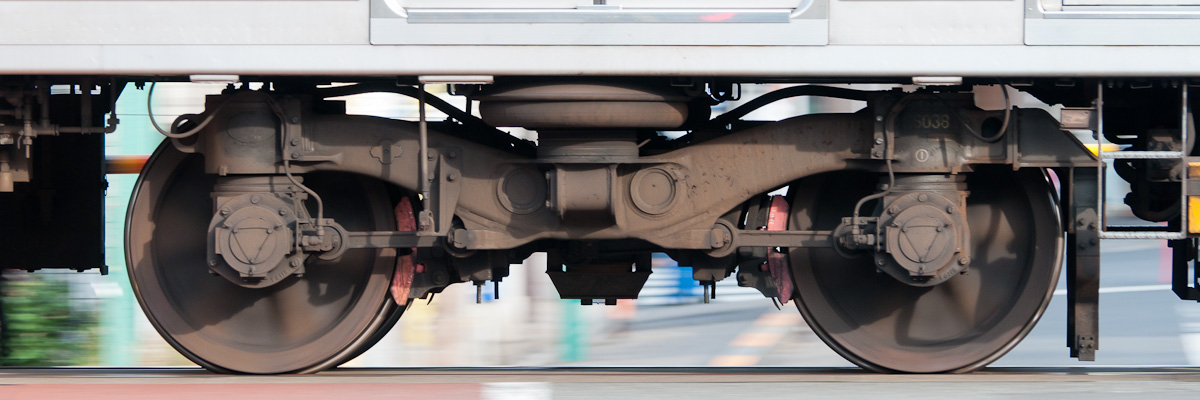
SS038 trailer bogie

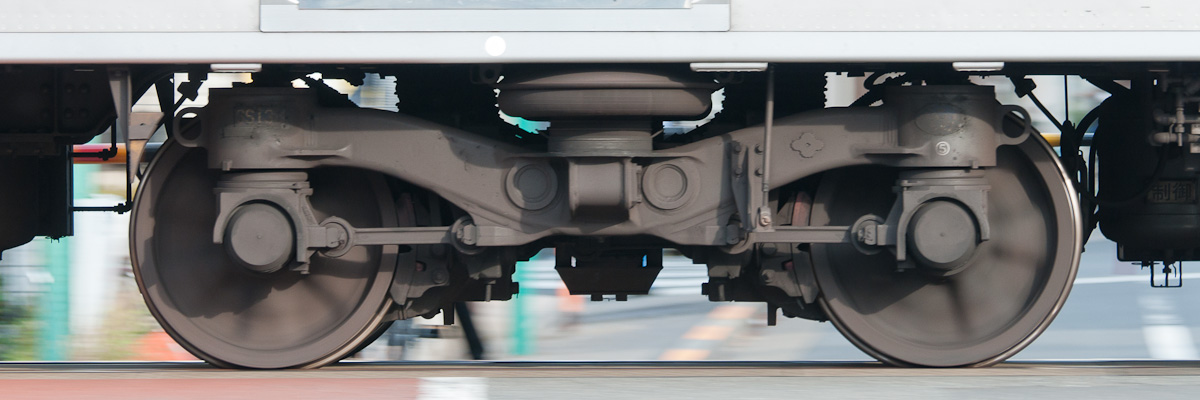
SS138 motored bogie

== Interior ==
Passenger accommodation consists of longitudinal seating throughout.

The first three sets delivered, sets 31601, 31401, and 31402, had flat panels on the seat ends and no centre stanchions. Set 31403 was fitted with contoured seats, and these were fitted on all subsequent sets delivered. Sets 31607 and 31407 onward had higher light blue panels on the seat ends.

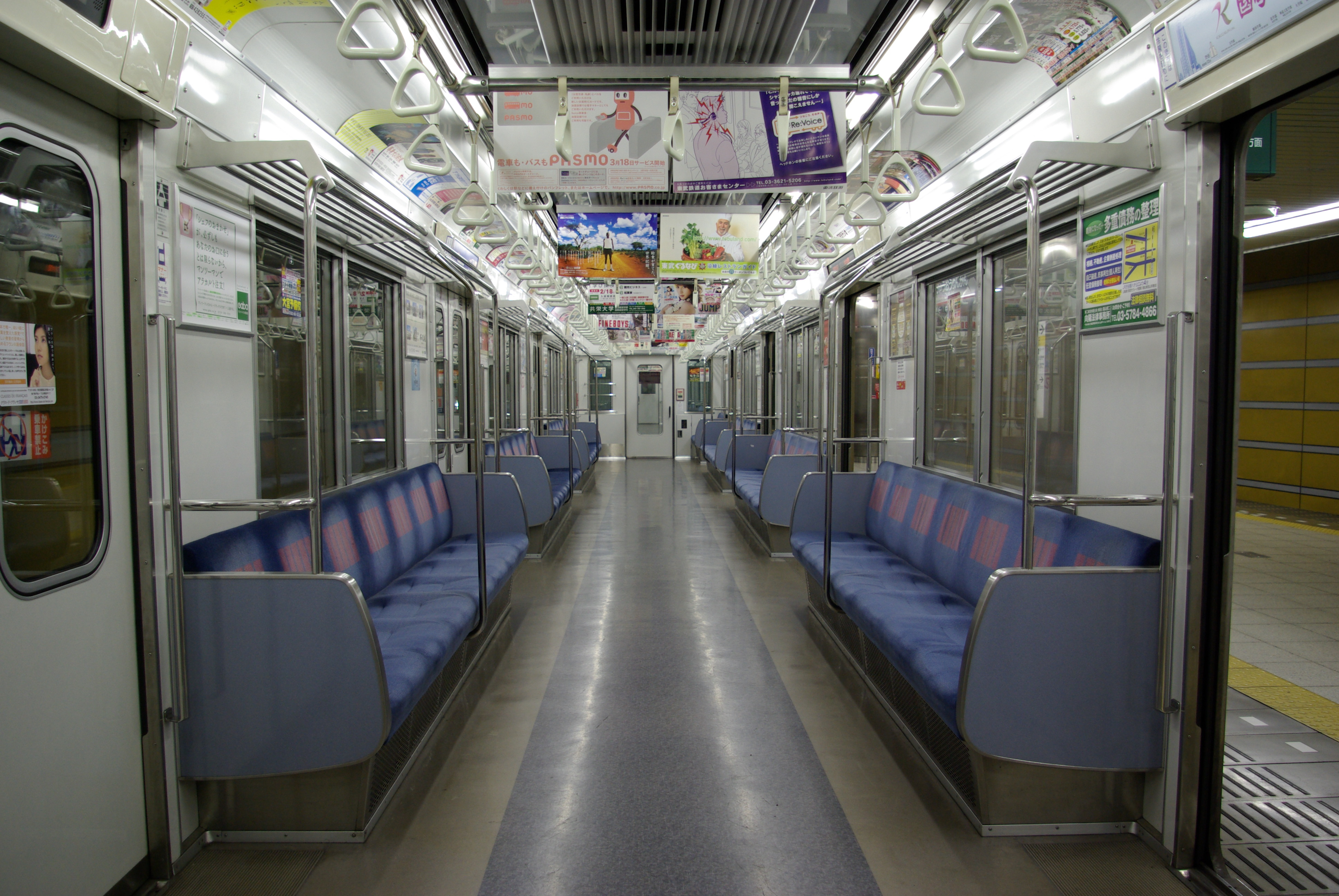
Interior view showing seating style in early sets (car 33405)

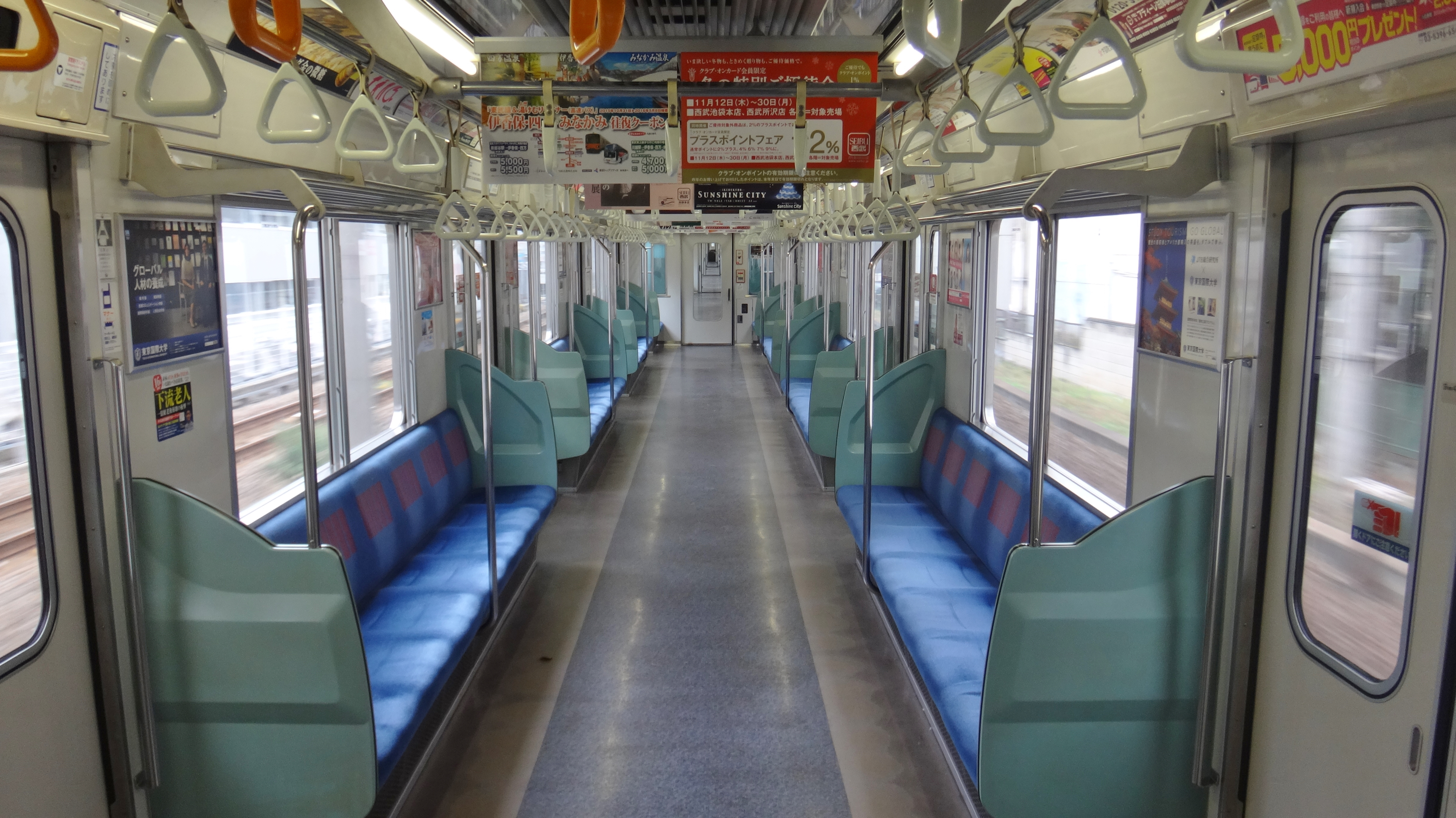
Interior view showing seating style in later sets (car 32612), November 2015

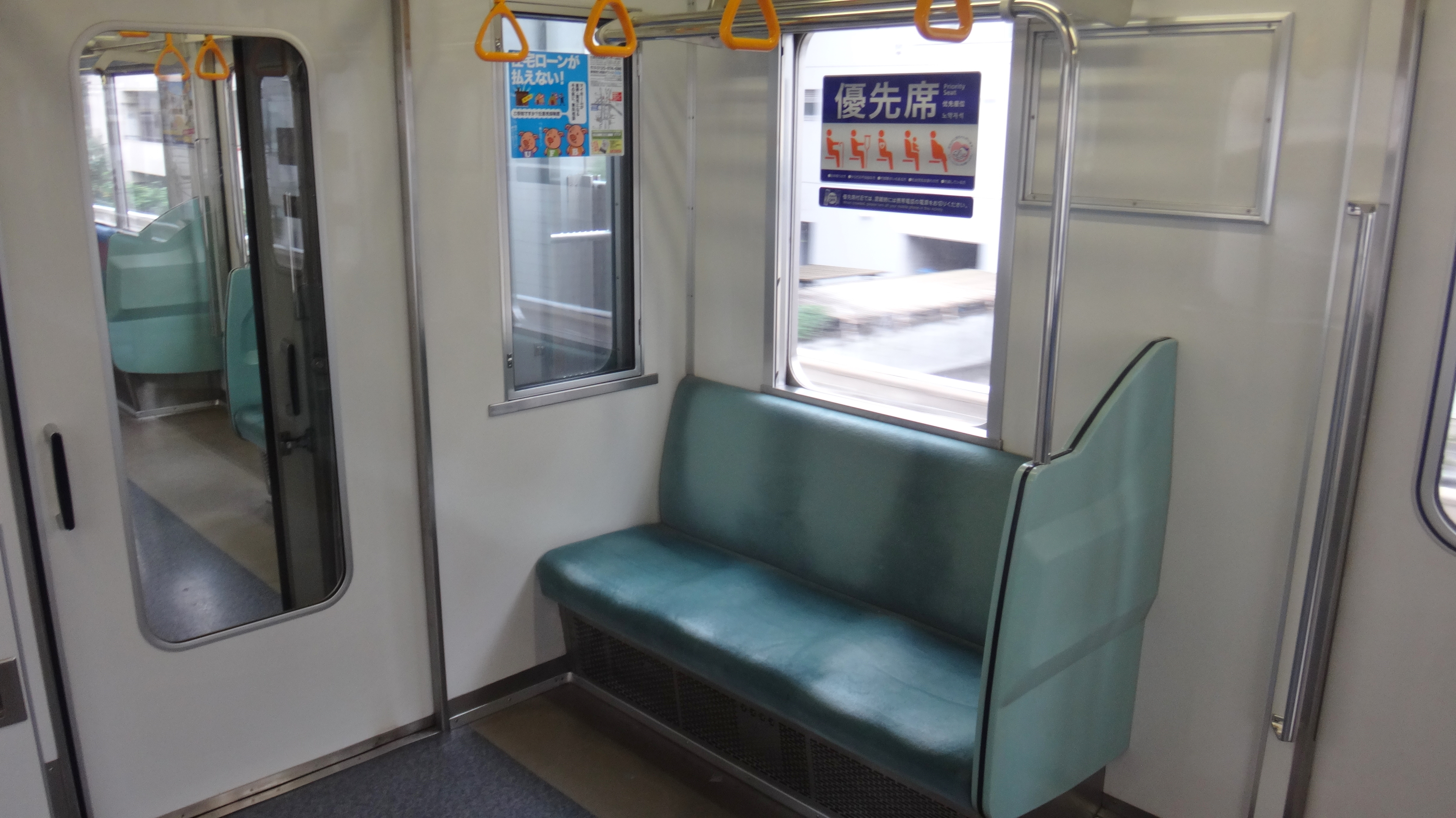
Priority seating in car 32612, November 2015

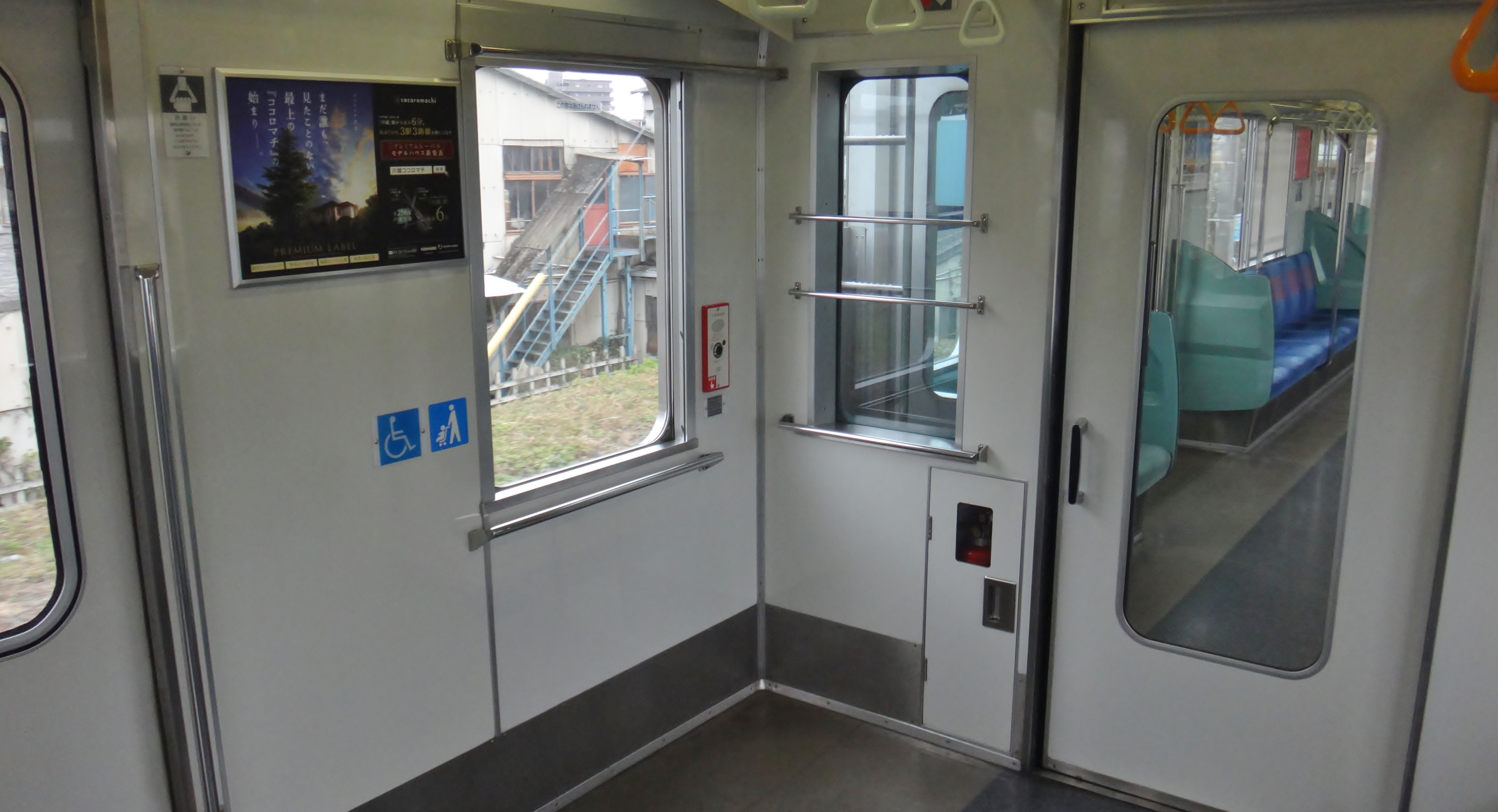
A wheelchair space in car 32612, November 2015

== History ==
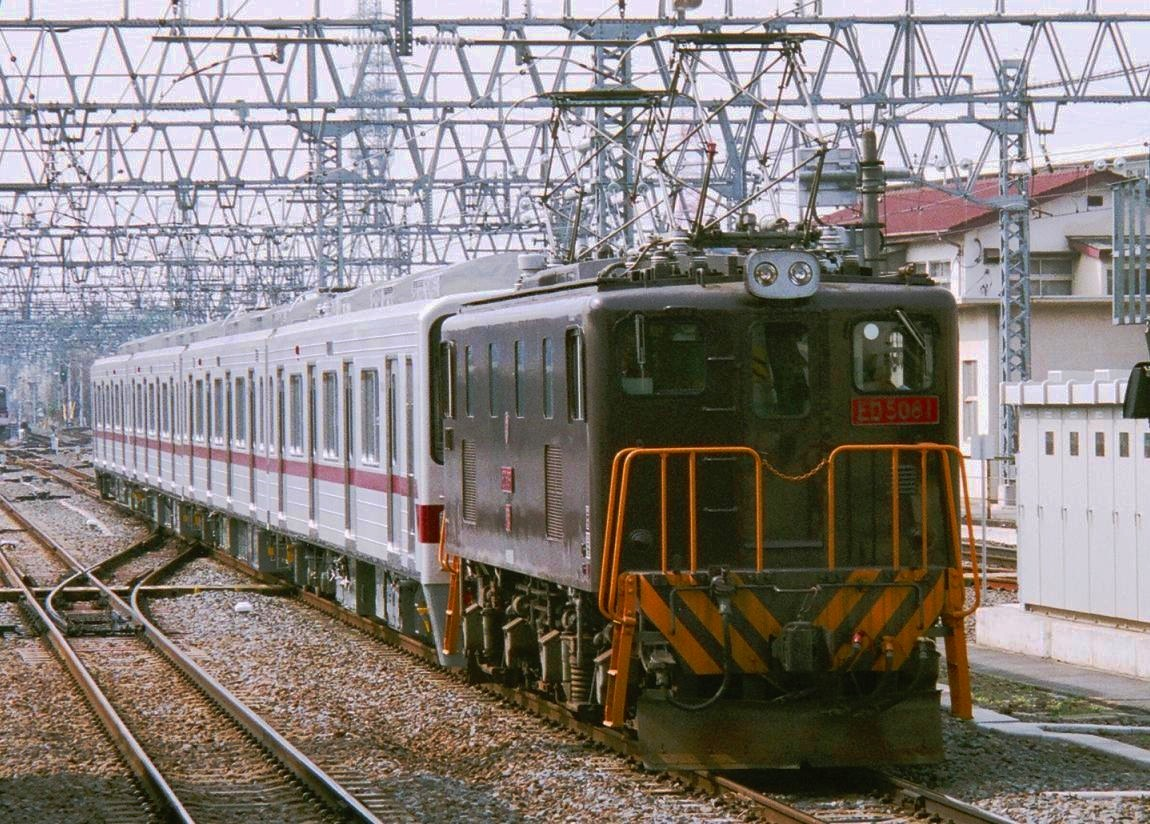
A six-car set being delivered in July 2001

The first set, 31601, was delivered in November 1996, with the first trains entering service on 25 March 1997. Initially used primarily on Tobu Isesaki Line services, they were introduced on through-running services to and from the Tokyu Den-en-toshi Line via the Tokyo Metro Hanzomon Line from March 2003, operating in 6+4-car formations. However, as the driving cabs between the two sets led to reduced capacity, which hampered the fleet's ability to cope with the congestion rates of the Hanzomon and Den-en-toshi lines, the 30000 series' usage on these services was reduced in late 2005. They were largely superseded by new 50050 series fixed 10-car sets from 18 March 2006. Sets withdrawn from Hanzomon Line through services were reallocated to services on the Isesaki, Nikko, and Utsunomiya lines.

=== Transfer to Tojo Line ===
From January 2011, pairs of four- and six-car sets were transferred to the Tobu Tojo Line, commencing with sets 31601 and 31401. These sets entered revenue service from 13 June 2011 following modifications at Shinrinkōen Depot to form a permanently coupled 10-car set with control equipment and skirts removed from the two intermediate driving cabs. In addition, the electrical couplers from the end cars were removed.

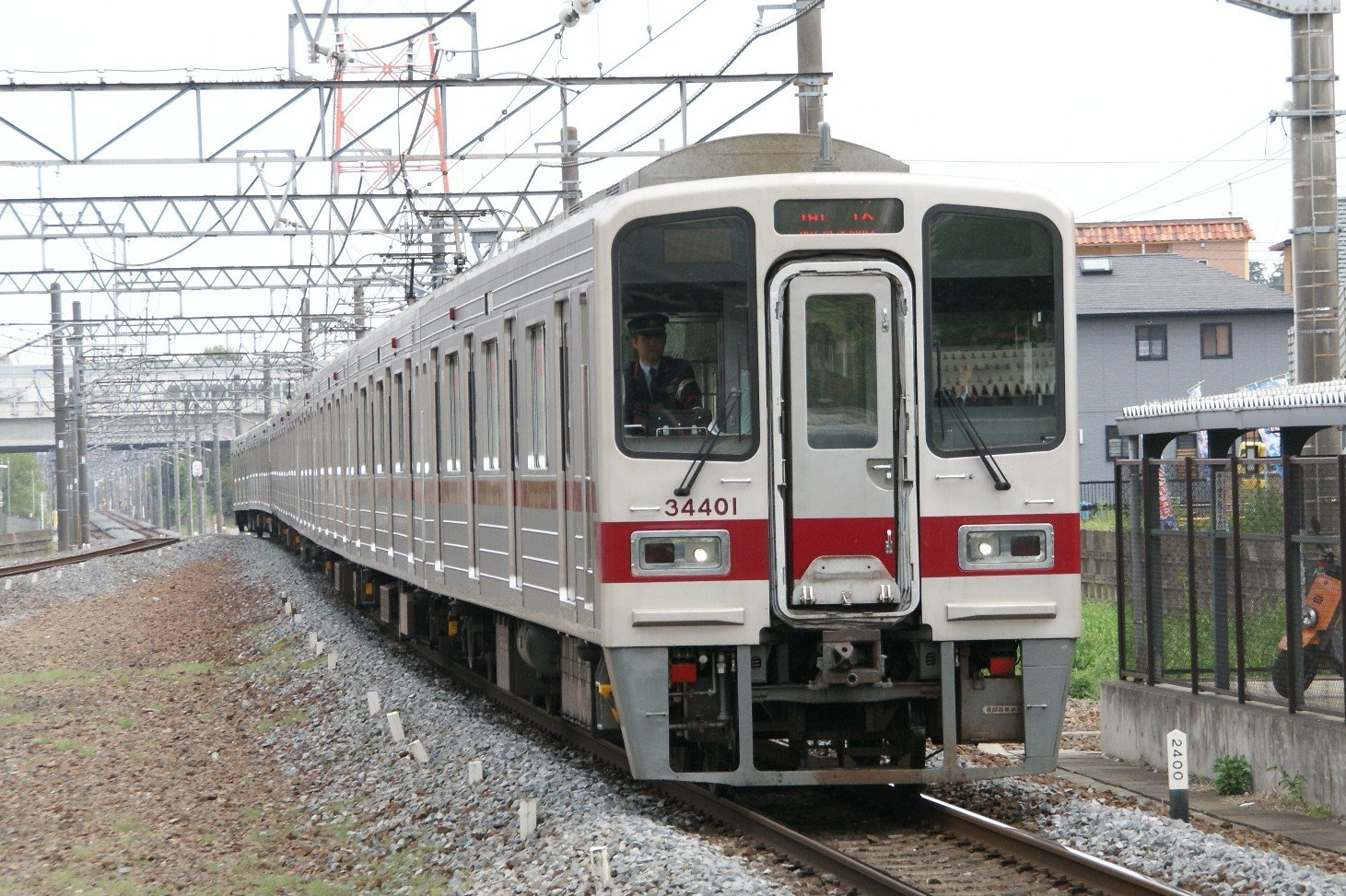
Permanently coupled sets 31401 and 31601 undergoing driver training on the Tojo Line, April 2011

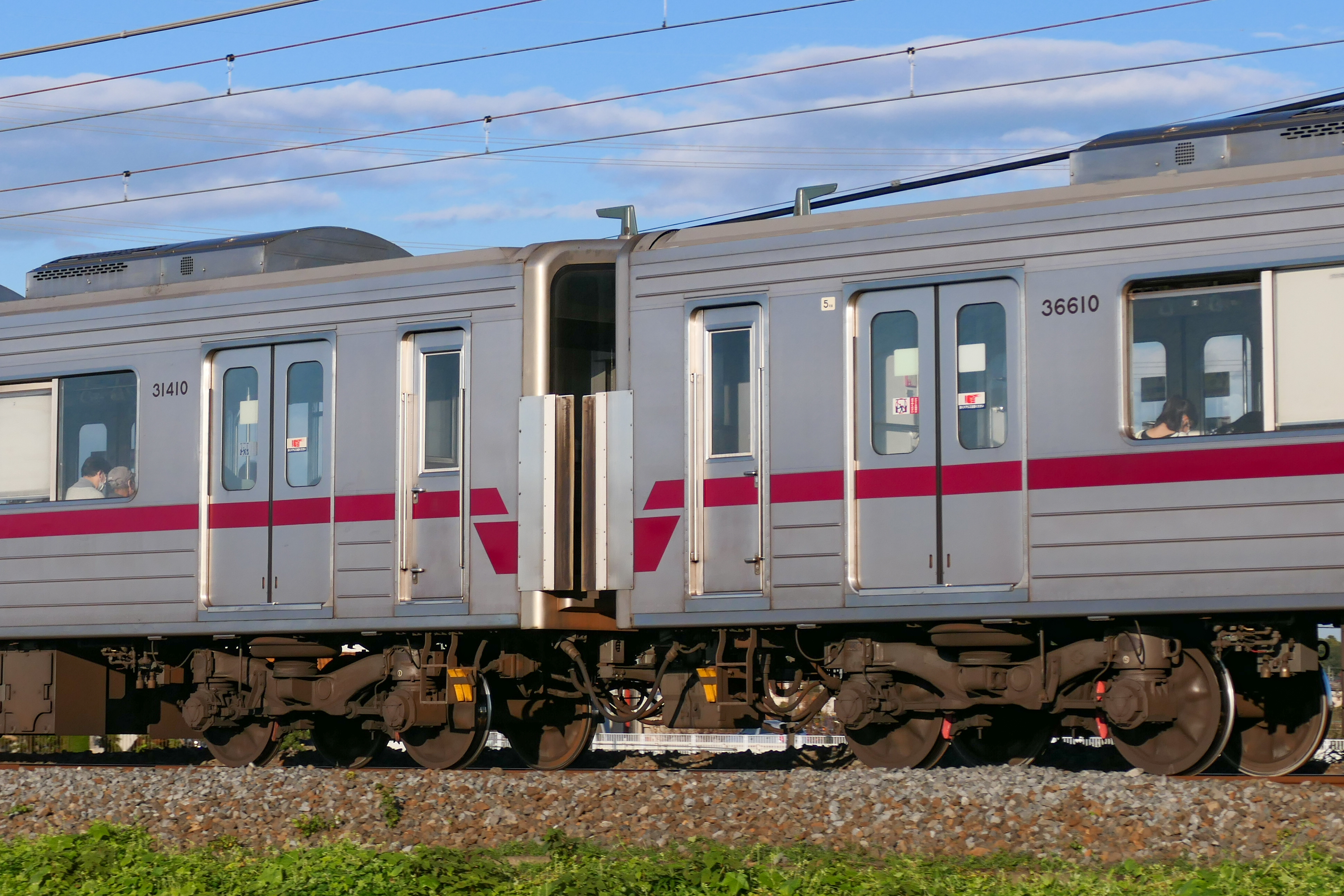
Permanently coupled intermediate driving cabs of cars 36610 and 31410, November 2021

==== Fixed 10-car set conversion dates ====
Set No.	Official modification date
31601+31401	23 March 2011
31602+31402	14 January 2015
31603+31403	3 December 2012
31604+31404	22 March 2013
31605+31405	5 July 2012
31606+31406	23 January 2020
31607+31407	23 October 2014
31608+31408	26 June 2013
31609+31409	
31610+31410	3 October 2012
31611+31411	18 November 2011
31612+31412	8 July 2014
31613+31413	27 January 2014
31614+31414	2 September 2014
31615+31415	8 October 2013

== Future ==
On 17 November 2025, Tobu Railway announced its plans to replace the 30000 series fleet with new 90000 series trainsets.
