= Tobu 9000 series =

Electric multiple unit operated by Tobu Railway in Japan

Tobu 9000/9050 series
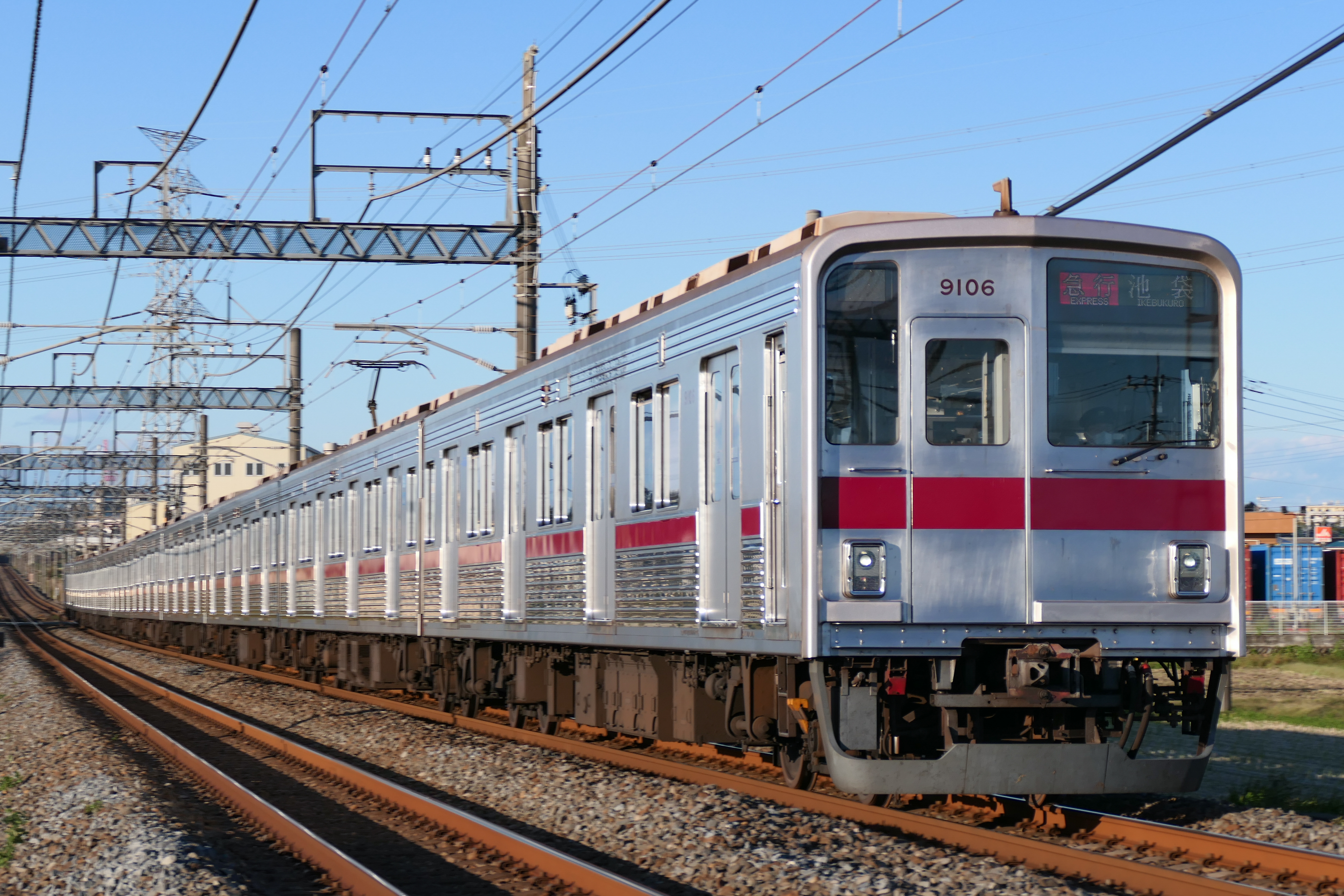
- Refurbished set 9106, October 2021
- Manufacturers: Tokyu Car Corporation, Fuji Heavy Industries, Alna Koki
- Constructed: 1981–1994
- Entered service: 1981
- Refurbished: 2007–2008
- Number built: 100 vehicles (10 sets)
- Number in service: 90 vehicles (9 sets)
- Formation: 10 cars per trainset
- Operator: Tobu Railway
- Depot: Shinrinkōen
- Lines served: Tobu Tojo Line; Tokyo Metro Yurakucho Line; Tokyo Metro Fukutoshin Line; Tokyu Toyoko Line; Minatomirai Line

Specifications
- Car body construction: Stainless steel
- Car length: 20 m (65 ft 7 in)
- Maximum speed: 110 km/h (68 mph)
- Traction system: Thyristor chopper (9101–9108); GTO–VVVF (9151 & 9152)
- Power output: 150 kW (201 hp) per motor
- Transmission: Cardan shaft: 87:16 (5.43) gear ratio (9000 series); 87:14 (6.21) gear ratio (9050 series)
- Acceleration: 3.3 km/(h⋅s) (2.1 mph/s)
- Deceleration: 3.7 km/(h⋅s) (2.3 mph/s) (service); 4.5 km/(h⋅s) (2.8 mph/s) (emergency)
- Electric systems: 1,500 V DC
- Current collection: Overhead lines
- Track gauge: 1,067 mm (3 ft 6 in)

The Tobu 9000 series (東武9000系, Tōbu 9000-kei) is a DC electric multiple unit (EMU) commuter train type operated by the private railway operator Tobu Railway in Japan since 1981.

== Operations ==
First entering service in 1981 on the Tobu Tojo Line, this was the first stainless steel EMU type to be introduced by Tobu. A total of ten 10-car sets were ultimately built for use on through-running services over the Tokyo Metro Yurakucho Line and Tokyo Metro Fukutoshin Line, as well as Tojo Line services between Ikebukuro and Ogawamachi.

== Variants ==
- Prototype set 9101
- Production sets 9102-9108
- 9050 series VVVF sets 9151-9152

=== Prototype set 9101 ===
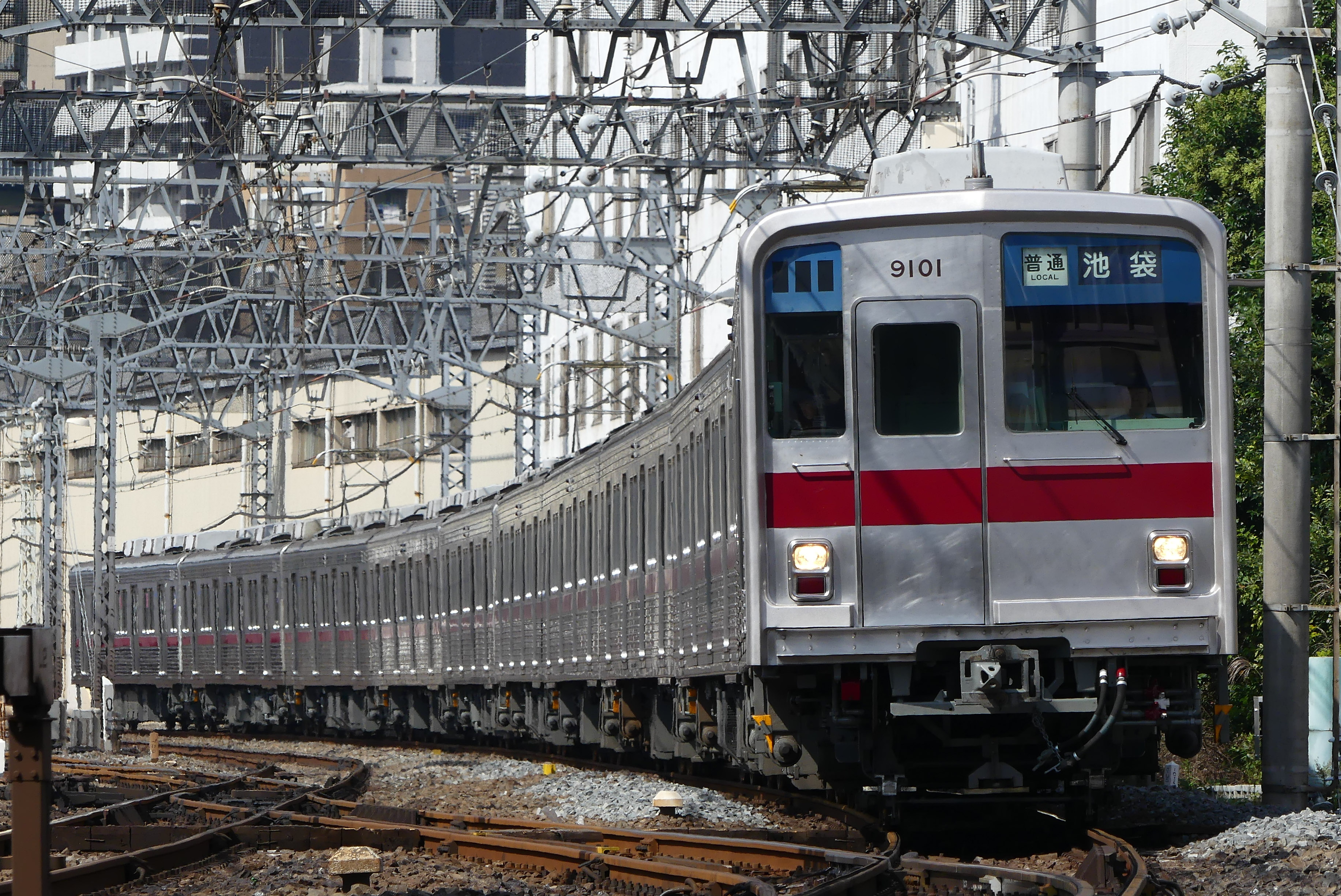
Set 9101, October 2017

Built in October 1981, this was the first stainless steel EMU type to be introduced by Tobu, and featured a bodyline stripe using the same "Royal maroon" colour as previously used on Tobu 1720 series "DRC" trains. Set 9101 was built jointly by three manufacturers, with four cars (9101–9401) built by Tokyu Car Corporation, two cars (9501–9601) by Fuji Heavy Industries, and four cars (9701–9001) by Alna Koki (now Alna Sharyo).

The seats on this set were originally brown, but this was later changed to the standard light green colour.

It was withdrawn from service in July 2021, and was transported from Shinrin-koen to Kitatatebayashi on 16 and 17 October 2023, where it is expected to be scrapped.

==== Formation ====
Designation	Tc1	M1	M2	T1	M1	M3	T2	M1	M4	Tc2
Numbering	9100	9200	9300	9400	9500	9600	9700	9800	9900	9000

The M1 cars are each fitted with one scissors type pantograph.

=== Production sets 9102-9108 ===
Sets 9102 to 9107 were built in 1987, incorporating a number of minor improvements over the prototype set. Seat width was increased from 425 mm to 450 mm.

An additional set, 9108, was built in 1991, based on the 10030 series lightweight body style.

==== Formation ====
Designation	Tc1	M1	M2	T1	M1	M3	T2	M1	M4	Tc2
Numbering	9100	9200	9300	9400	9500	9600	9700	9800	9900	9000

The M1 cars are each fitted with one single-arm pantograph.

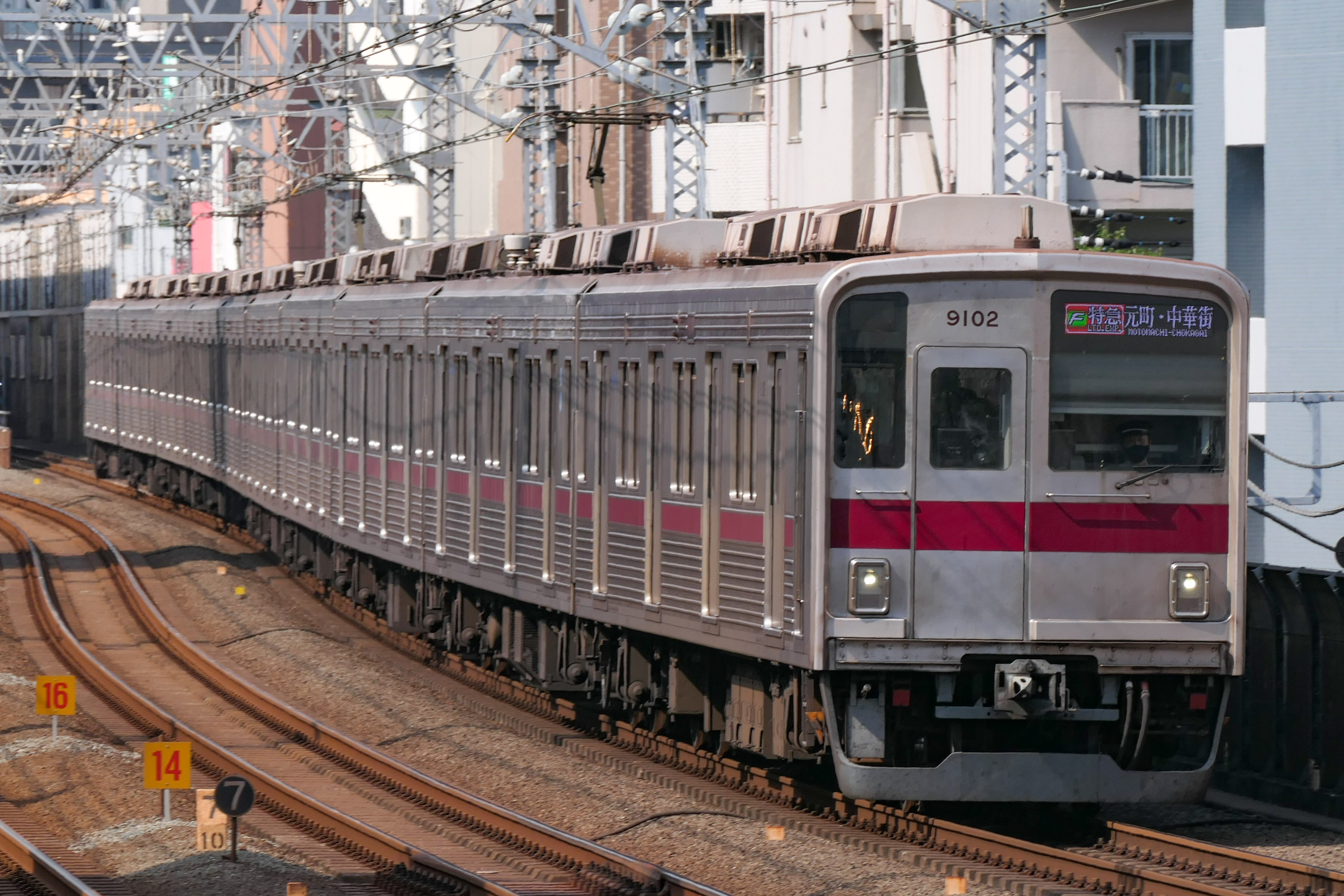
First refurbished set, 9102, June 2021

=== 9050 series VVVF sets ===
Two 9050 series sets were introduced in December 1994, coinciding with the opening of the "Yurakucho New Line" (now part of the Tokyo Metro Fukutoshin Line) between Kotakemukaihara and Ikebukuro. These incorporated further design improvements and changes similar to the 20050 series trains, notably VVVF control, bolsterless bogies, 3-colour LED destination indicators, LCD interior passenger information displays, and brown seat moquette. The LCD passenger information displays were removed in 1999.

==== Formation ====
Designation	Tc3	M5	M6	T3	M7	M8	T4	M7	M9	Tc4
Numbering	9150	9250	9350	9450	9550	9650	9750	9850	9950	9050

The M5 and M7 cars are each fitted with one single-arm pantograph.

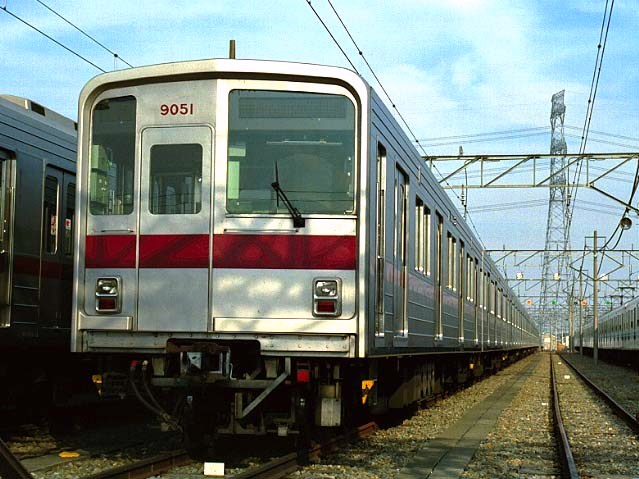
Set 9151 before refurbishment, March 1998

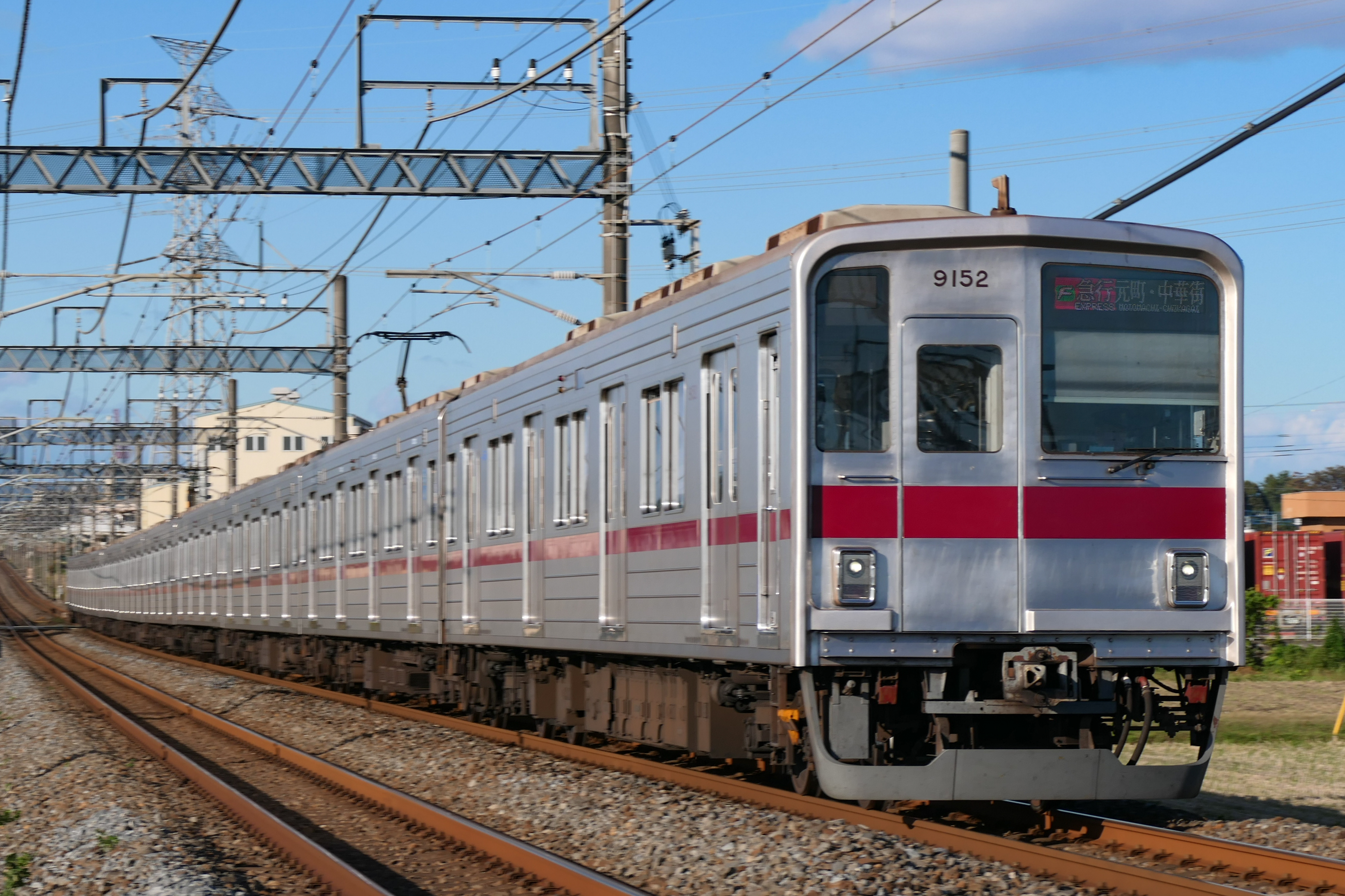
Refurbished set 9152, October 2021

== Refurbishment ==
From April 2007 to 2008, all of the 9000 and 9050 series sets except prototype set 9101 underwent refurbishment ahead of introduction on Tokyo Metro Fukutoshin Line inter-running services from June 2008. Refurbishment included totally new interiors and cabs based on the 50070 series design. Externally, single-arm pantographs were fitted, and the destination indicator blinds replaced with full-colour LED displays. Prototype set 9101 was not refurbished due to the different door spacing of this set, making it incompatible with the platform doors on the Fukutoshin Line. This set is restricted to Tōbu Tōjō Line overground duties.

== Interior ==
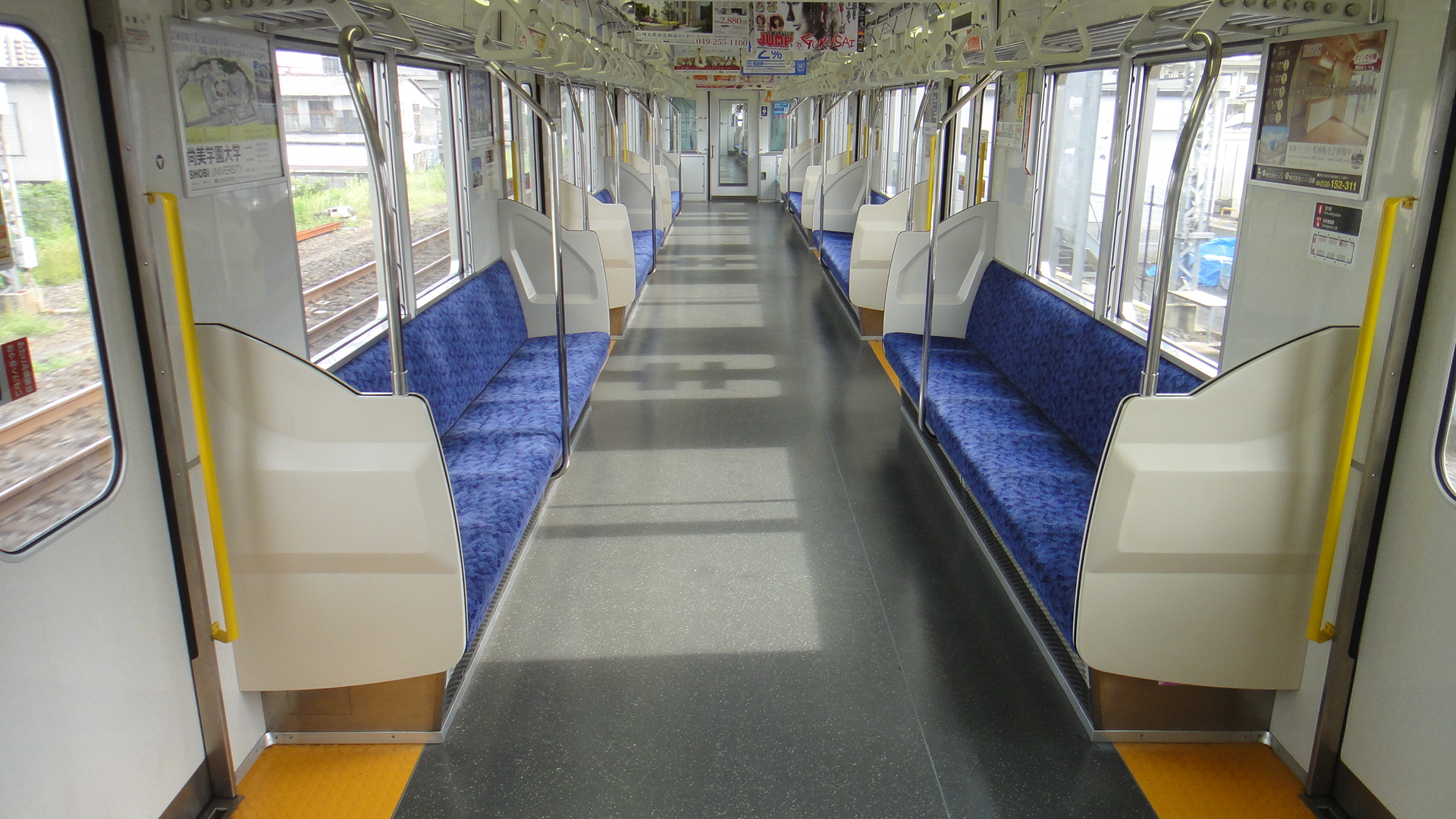
Interior view of a refurbished 9050 series set, September 2012

== Future ==
On 30 April 2024, as part of its fiscal 2024 capital investment plan, Tobu Railway announced plans to replace the 9000 series with a new fleet of rolling stock. In March 2025, the new fleet was announced to be the 90000 series, scheduled to be introduced from 2026.
