= Osaka Maritime Museum =

- なにわの海の時空館
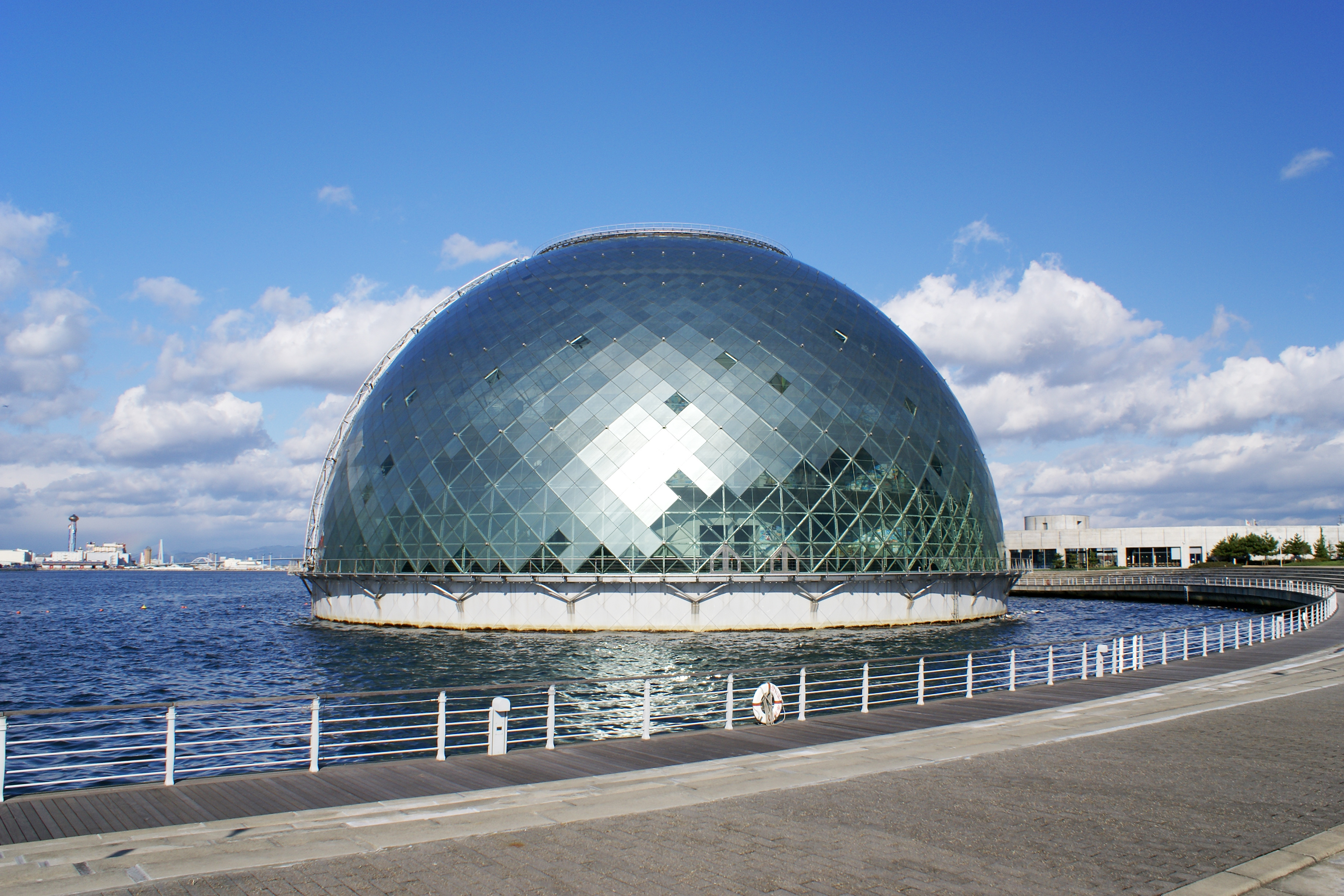
- The dome that houses the museum's exhibits is 15 m from shore.
- Interactive map of the Osaka Maritime Museum area

General information
- Location: Osaka, Japan
- Coordinates: 34°38′24.17″N 135°24′16.46″E
- Construction started: March 1998
- Completed: May 2000
- Cost: 12.8bn yen
- Client: Port and Harbor Bureau, City of Osaka
- Owner: Osaka Gas Business Create Co., Ltd.

Design and construction
- Architect: Paul Andreu
- Structural engineer: Arup and Tohata

The Osaka Maritime Museum (なにわの海の時空館, Naniwa no Umi no Jikūkan) was a maritime museum in Osaka, Japan. It was opened by the Mayor of Osaka City on 14 July 2000 having started on site in March 1998. Designed by architect Paul Andreu with engineering design by Arup and Tohata. the museum was built on reclaimed land in the Bay of Osaka at a cost of 12.8bn yen, with a replica Edo period trading ship, the Naniwa Maru as its centrepiece. The requirement of the dome to resist seismic, wave, and wind loads and its successful completion, led to the building winning a Structural Special Award in 2002 from the Institution of Structural Engineers, UK.

The museum was closed on 10 March 2013 because of financial problems, and because the number of visitors had greatly reduced after the museum's initial popularity.

== Site and brief ==
Osaka City wished to develop a museum that reflected the maritime history of the port city. They had planned for it to be placed on reclaimed land in Osaka Bay, where a number of office schemes and a convention centre had been built, to create a landmark building to draw people from the city centre. Upon approaching Paul Andreu he provided preliminary sketches showing a dome, and suggested that the museum should be placed in the water itself and so a 300,000 m² basin was to be excavated from the reclaimed land with a spherical dome seeming to float in the bay, accessed by a submerged tunnel.

== Design ==
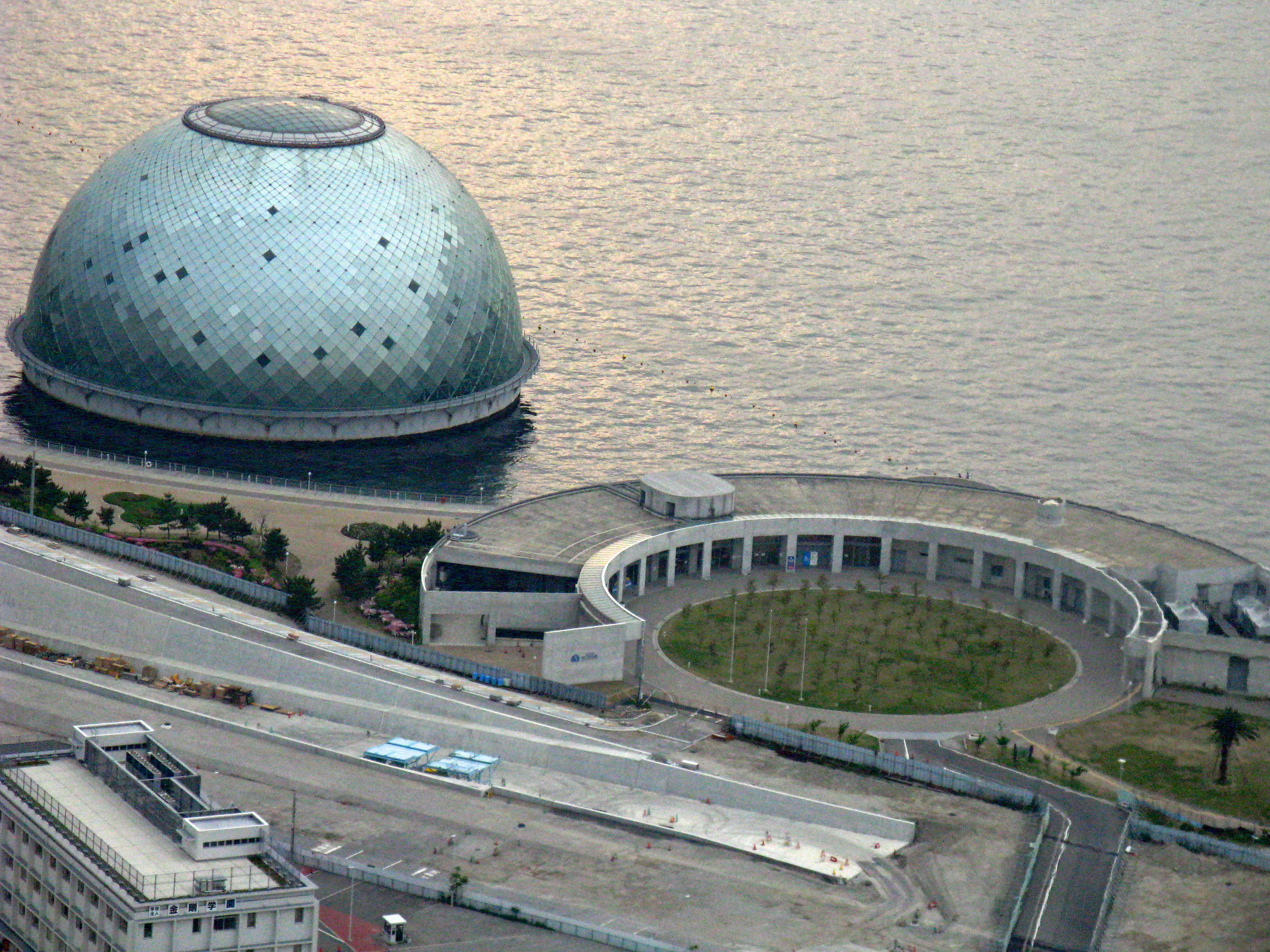
The dome is connected to the land side by a 60m underwater tunnel.

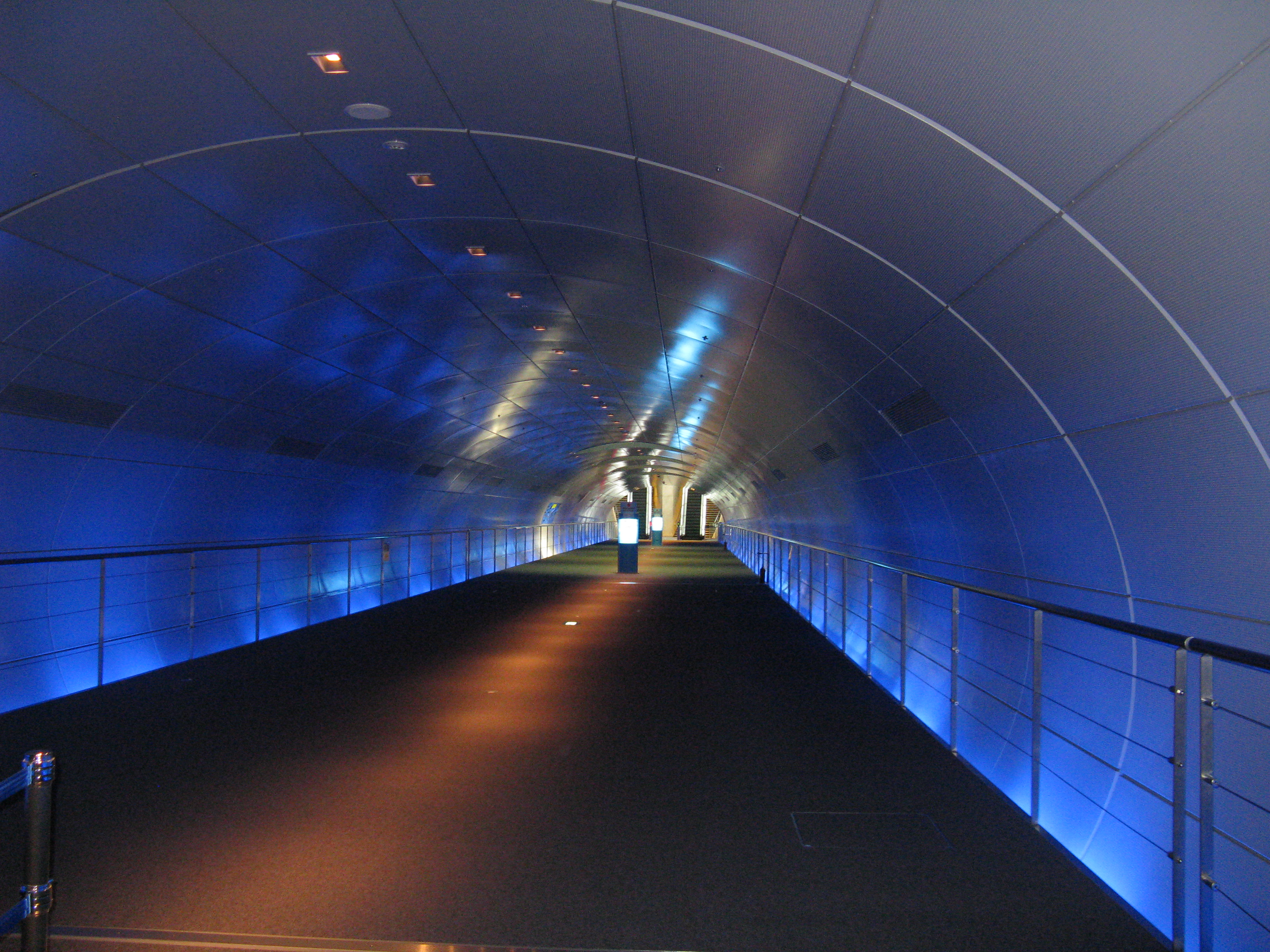
The submerged tunnel connecting the entrance to the dome

Andreu based the dome on a viviani's curve. Arup were responsible for the design of the structural, mechanical, electrical and seismic engineering solutions for the dome and internal structure holding the exhibits within, whilst Japanese firm Tohata were responsible for the engineering of the entrance building, the submerged tunnel and the dome substructure.

With a site consisting of 25 m of reclaimed land on top of 15 m of alluvial clay, piles were designed to be 40 m long. To prevent the building sinking into the ground if an earthquake caused liquefaction of the ground, the top 10 m of the piles were designed as precast concrete piles with steel casings. In order to prevent the building from rising up due to buoyancy the piles were cast with a ground floor slab 1.6 – 2.5 m thick to provide sufficient weight.

The semicircular landside building contained a ticket office, the entrance hall and administrative offices, with storage and plant space in two basement levels below. From the entrance hall visitors descended to the submerged tunnel in glazed risers. The tunnel was made from reinforced concrete and was 15 m wide and 60 m long, but the shortest distance from the dome to shore was 15 m

The final design was for a 20,000 m^{2} building, consisting of a 5,000 m^{2} landside entry building, the 60m submerged tunnel of 1,000 m^{2}, opening into the dome, which encased four levels totalling 14,000 m^{2}.

== Construction ==
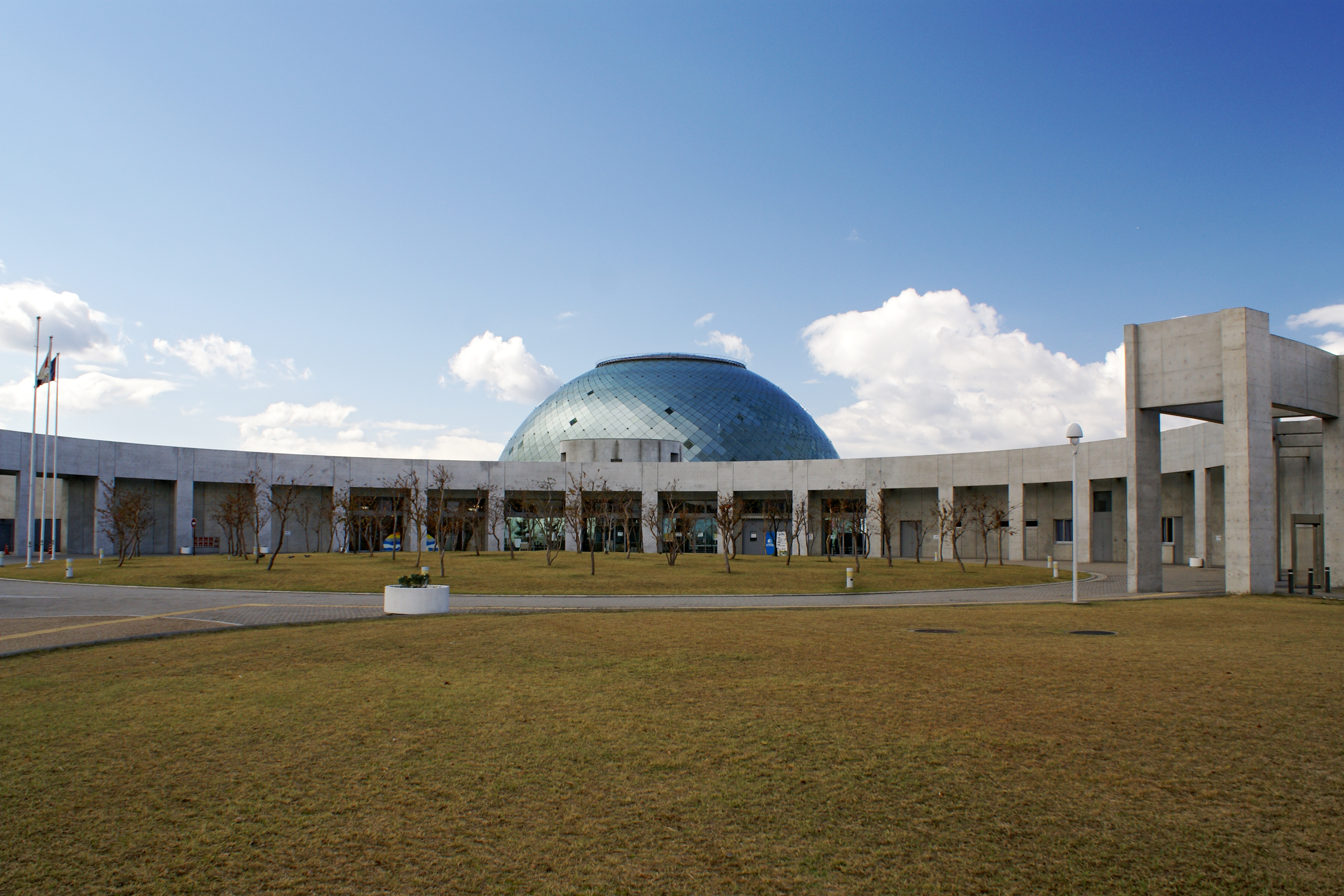
A view of the dome behind the landside entrance building

There was a short 25 month construction programme for the museum and the dome was the most critical part of the building process. It was discovered that the dome could be built offsite whilst the internal section was built onsite, avoiding any potential construction clash and ensuring the project would be completed on time. This also meant the dome structure was isolated from the internal structure, simplifying the earthquake resistance. The Harima works of Kawasaki Heavy Industries were chosen to build the dome, partly because they were only 33 km away on the other side of Osaka Bay. On 3 November 1998 a 4,100 ton floating crane lifted the 1,200 ton dome and lifting rig onto a barge. On 5 November the barge made the 6 hour journey to the museum site and after a day of checks the floating crane again lifted the dome, manoeuvred towards the completed substructure and lowered the dome into place.

== Museum ==
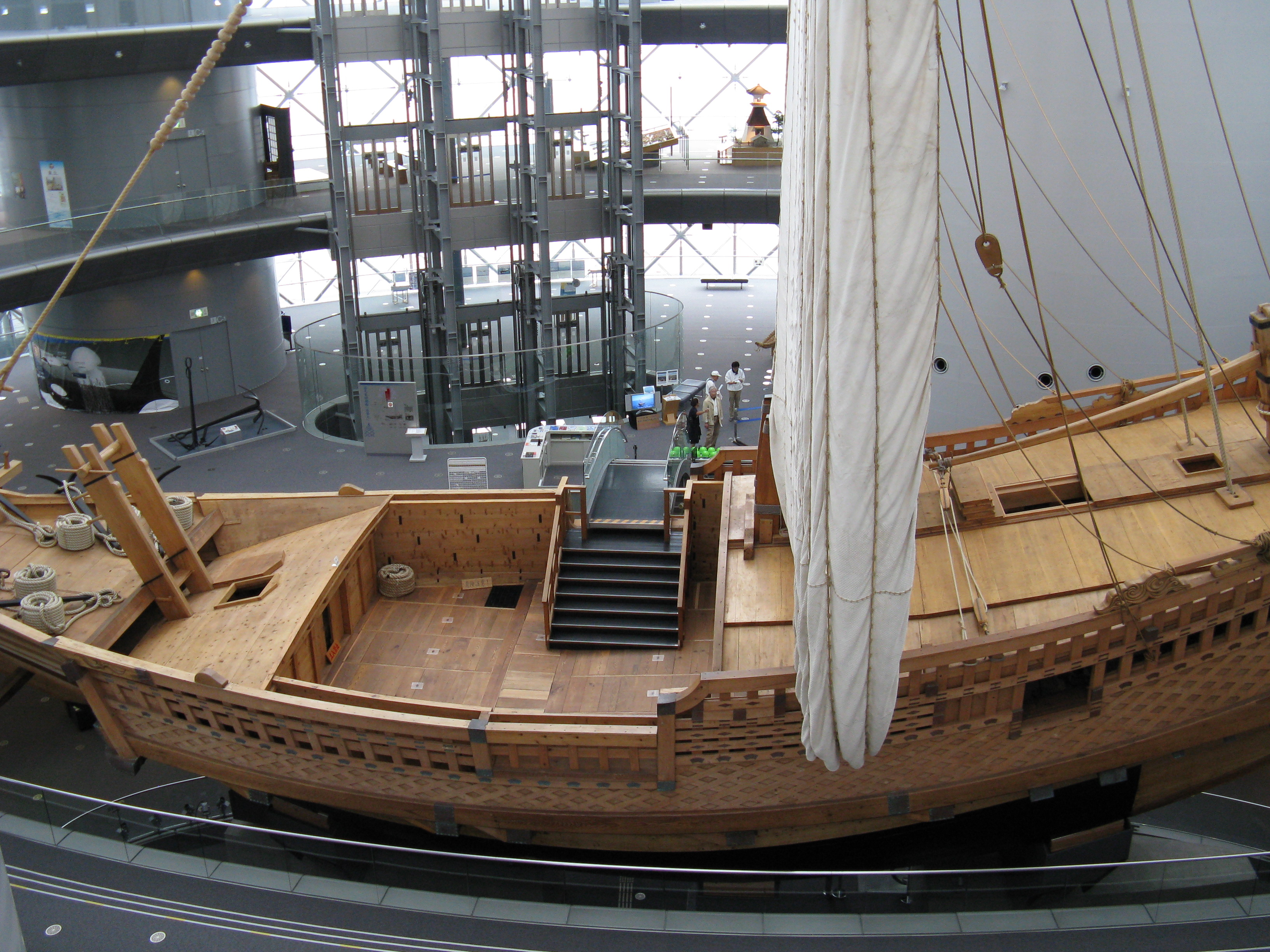
The merchant ship Naniwa Maru in the middle of the dome

Osaka is a port and grew rapidly during the Edo period, becoming known as Japan's kitchen. The aim of the museum was to show how the sea, ships and harbour were used to the benefit of Osaka and the general development of maritime culture around the world.

The central exhibit was the replica Naniwa Maru, a 17th-century trade ship or higaki kaisen. The ship was trialled in Osaka Bay before being enclosed in the museum when the dome was brought to site. On the four floors surrounding and beneath the Naniwa Maru there are a range of artifacts and exhibits tracking the development of sea trade around Osaka and internationally. These include Ukiyo-e prints, replica figureheads and a display of shipwright's tools.

Two video theaters were in the basement. "The Sea Adventure Pavilion" offered a fictional story with a young Japanese seafarer, encountering pirates, and raging waves, while the seats swang in response to the view on screen. "Theater of the Sea" took viewers through Venice with a 3-D film and simulated wind and smells. Finally a yacht simulator, gave visitors the opportunity to try their hand at virtual sailing.
