= Kaisen (circuit ship) =

Kaisen, or "circuit ship," refers to Japanese cargo ships used for transporting goods either on consignment or to market. These vessels were used regularly in the Inland Sea by the mid-13th century. By the end of the Kamakura period, however, circuit ships were also traveling to and from distant ports.

== History ==
Contemporary records show that Kaisen ships played a significant role in the economic growth of the medieval period. Different types of circuit ships were also crucial to the development of trade in the early modern period, particularly in facilitating the transportation of goods between Osaka and Edo.

Circuit ships took advantage of the new maritime trade routes established in the latter half of the 17th century. It wasn't until the late 19th century, with the introduction of Western technologies like steamships, that the use of circuit ships began to decline.

== See also ==
- Naniwa Maru
- Kitamaebune
- Atakebune
- Red seal ships
- Takasebune
- Ohama Kagetaka
