= Kaisen Linux =

Linux distribution

- Kaisen Linux KDE default desktop
- Developer: Kaisen Linux team and volunteer contributors
- OS family: Linux (Unix-like)
- Working state: Discontinued
- Source model: Open-source
- Initial release: alpha / 14 December 2019 (6 years ago)
- Latest release: 3.0 / 13 August 2025
- Marketing target: Servers
- Update method: apt
- Package manager: APT
- Supported platforms: x86-64
- Kernel type: Monolithic (Linux kernel)
- Userland: GNU
- Default user interface: KDE Plasma, LXQt, MATE, Xfce
- License: Free software
- Official website: https://kaisenlinux.org

Kaisen Linux (stylized as ka:sen linux) is a discontinued system rescue Linux distribution based on Debian and composed of free and open-source software. It originated from France. Kaisen is designated for IT professionals. The operating system is developed by Kaisen Team which is led by Kevin Chevreuil. It is also supported by volunteers. It has KDE Plasma, LXQt, MATE, Xfce interfaces.

On 13 August 2025, Chevreuil announced that Kaisen Linux is no longer in development following the release of version 3.0 on that day.

== See also ==
- Comparison of Linux distributions
- Debian
- Linux
