= Smallpox demon =

Japanese mythological figure

Smallpox demon (Japanese: 疱瘡神, Hōsōgami, Hōsōshin) or smallpox devil is a demon which was believed to be responsible for causing smallpox in medieval Japan. In those days, people tried to appease the smallpox demon by assuaging his anger, or they tried to attack the demon since they had no other effective treatment for smallpox. Methods used to try to assuage or please the smallpox demon were using a sanshin, a musical instrument, lion dances, flowers, incense, and poetry. Some of these traditional smallpox dances are still overserved today.

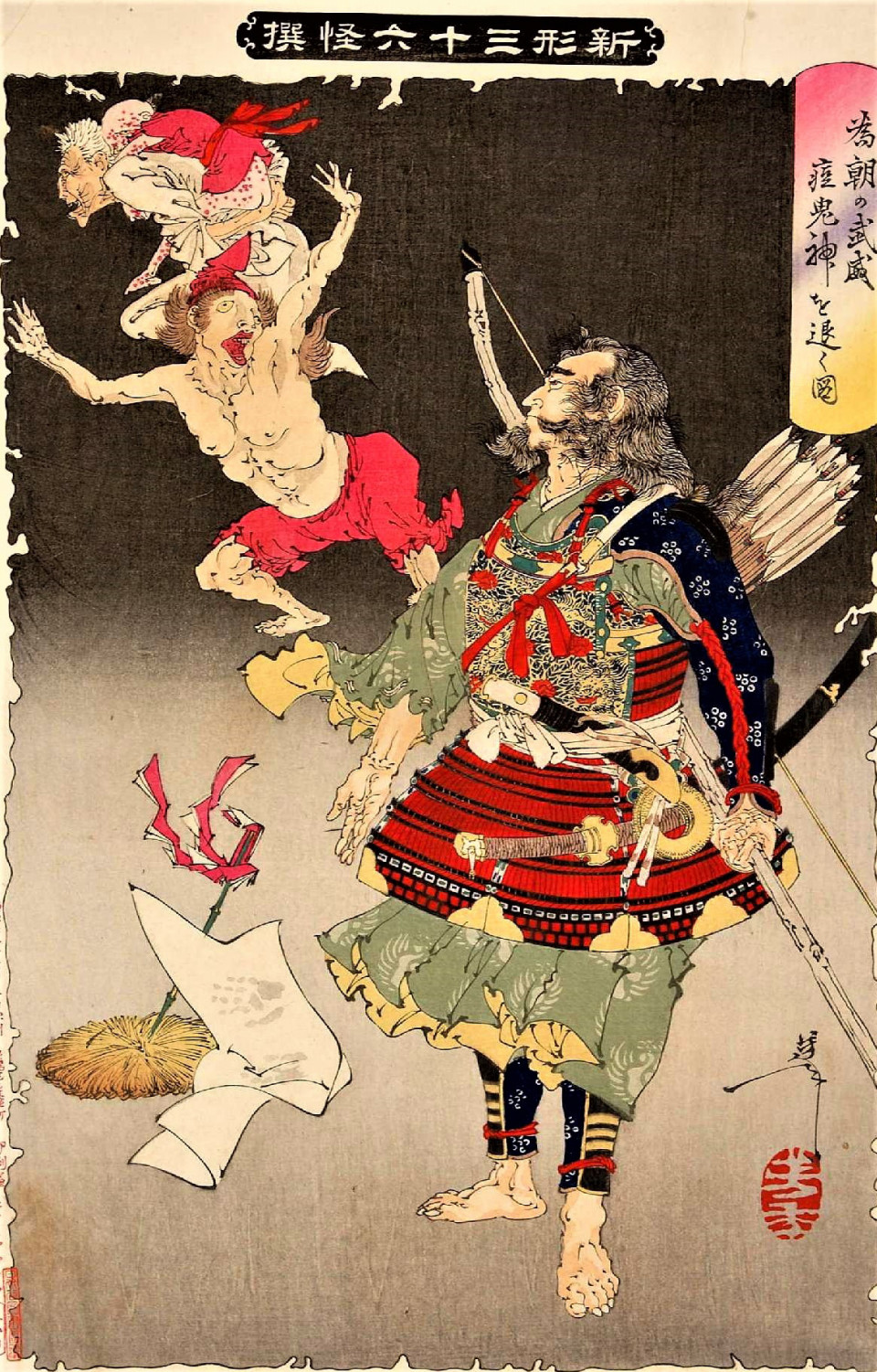
Minamoto no Tametomo defeats a smallpox devil from Yoshitoshi's 36 drawings of Yokai

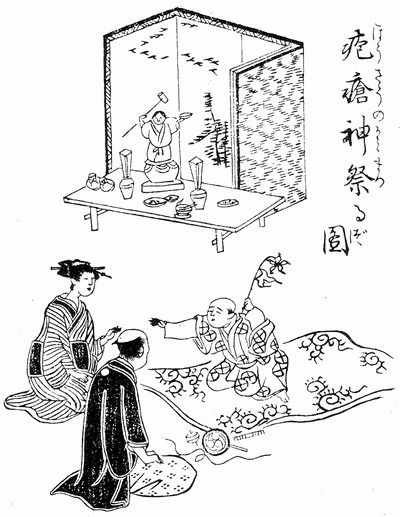
A smallpox demon enshrined

== History ==
In Japanese, the word hōsōshin or hōsōgami (疱瘡神 (ほうそうしん, ほうそうがみ）) translates literally to "smallpox god". According to the Shoku Nihongi, smallpox was introduced into Japan in 735 into the Fukuoka Prefecture from Korea. In those days, smallpox had been considered to be the result of onryō, which was a mythological spirit from Japanese folklore who is able to return to the physical world in order to seek vengeance. Smallpox-related kami include Sumiyoshi sanjin. In a book published in the Kansei years (1789–1801), there were lines that wrote that smallpox devils were enshrined in families which had smallpox in order to recover from smallpox.

Smallpox devils were said to be afraid of red things and also of dogs; thus people displayed various dolls that were red. In Okinawa, they tried to praise and comfort devils with sanshin, an Okinawan musical instrument, and lion dances before a patient clad in red clothes. They offered flowers and burned incense in order to please smallpox demon. In Okinawa, there was smallpox poetry in Ryuka; the purpose of smallpox poetry in the Ryukyu language is the glorification of the smallpox demon, or improvement from deadly infection of smallpox. There is a collection of smallpox poetry including 105 poems published in 1805. Traditional smallpox folk dances have been observed even in present-day Japan, including Ibaraki Prefecture and Kagoshima Prefecture, for the avoidance of smallpox devils.

== Red treatment ==
In European countries the "red treatment" was practiced from the 12th century onwards; when he caught smallpox, King Charles V of France was dressed in a red shirt, red stockings, and a red veil. Queen Elizabeth I of England was likewise wrapped in a red blanket and placed by a live fire when she fell ill with smallpox in 1562, and similar treatments were applied to other European monarchs. In parts of India, China, Africa and Latin America, sacrifices were made to appease the gods of smallpox. In medieval Europe, prayer and pious living were recommended as one way to guard against sickness. Many Japanese textbooks on dermatology stated that red light was able to weaken the symptoms of smallpox. This was common in China, India, Turkey and Georgia. In western Africa, the Yoruba god of smallpox, Sopona, was associated with the color red.

The red treatment was given scientific authority by Nobel laureate Niels Ryberg Finsen, who claimed that the treatment of smallpox patients with red light reduced the severity of scarring, and later developed rules governing erythrotherapy. These beliefs lingered on into the 1930s until researchers declared it to be "useless."

Red treatment may also refer to the color red being the warning sign of smallpox in the ancient Edo-period of Japan. Many old descriptions still exist referring to old shrines connected to smallpox, as having the color red. Many villages would stretch straw rope with red paper streamers around their houses and in the courtyards if there had been people afflicted with smallpox in the area.

== Footnotes ==
=== References ===
- Aoki, Naomi (2002). Manabu Ohishi (ed.). ビジュアル・ワイド江戸時代館 ヴィジュアル ワイド 江戸時代館 [Visual Wide Edo Book]. Shogakkan. ISBN 978-4-09-623021-3.
- Ohtsuka Minzokugakukai (1994). 日本民族事典 [Yamato people encyclopedia]. Kohbundoh. ISBN 978-4-335-57050-6.
- Kyogoku, Natsuhiko (2008). Katsumi Tada (ed.). 妖怪画本 狂歌百物語 [Yokai Illustrated]. Kokushokankohkai. ISBN 978-4-336-05055-7.
- Kubota, Hiromichi (2008). 日本の神様面白小辞典 [Jananse kami encyclopedia]. PHP editors group. ISBN 978-4-569-70460-9.
- Sakurai, Tokutaro (1980). 民間信仰事典 [Peoples belief encyclopedia]. Tokyodohshuppan. ISBN 978-4-490-10137-9.
- Tobe, Tamio (2007). 頼れる神様大辞典 [Dependable kami encyclopedia]. PHP Kenkyusho. ISBN 978-4-569-65829-2.
- Uyeno, Ken-ichi (2007). 夕映えの甍 [Roofs in the setting sun]. Iwanami Shuppan Service.
- Aoyama, Yoji (1998). 琉球おもしろ読本 [Ryukyu interesting book]. Kyodo Shuppan.
- Hopkins DR (2002). The Greatest Killer:Smallpox in history. University of Chicago. ISBN 978-0-226-35168-1. Originally published as Princes and Peasants: Smallpox in History (1983), ISBN 0-226-35177-7
- Higa (1983). 沖縄大百科事典下 [Okinawa Encyclopedia ge]. Okinawa Times.
