= Mukotorikon =

Superseded marital structure in Japan, where the couple lives near the brides parents

Mukotorikon (婿取婚 むことりこん）refers to a system of uxorilocal marital structure in Japan, particularly in Japan's medieval period which was largely superseded by a system of patrilocal marriage, as some men became in charge of units ie or za following changes in society such as the decline of the ritsuryo system.

== See also ==
Marriage in Japan
