= Takasebune =

Short story by Mori Ōgai

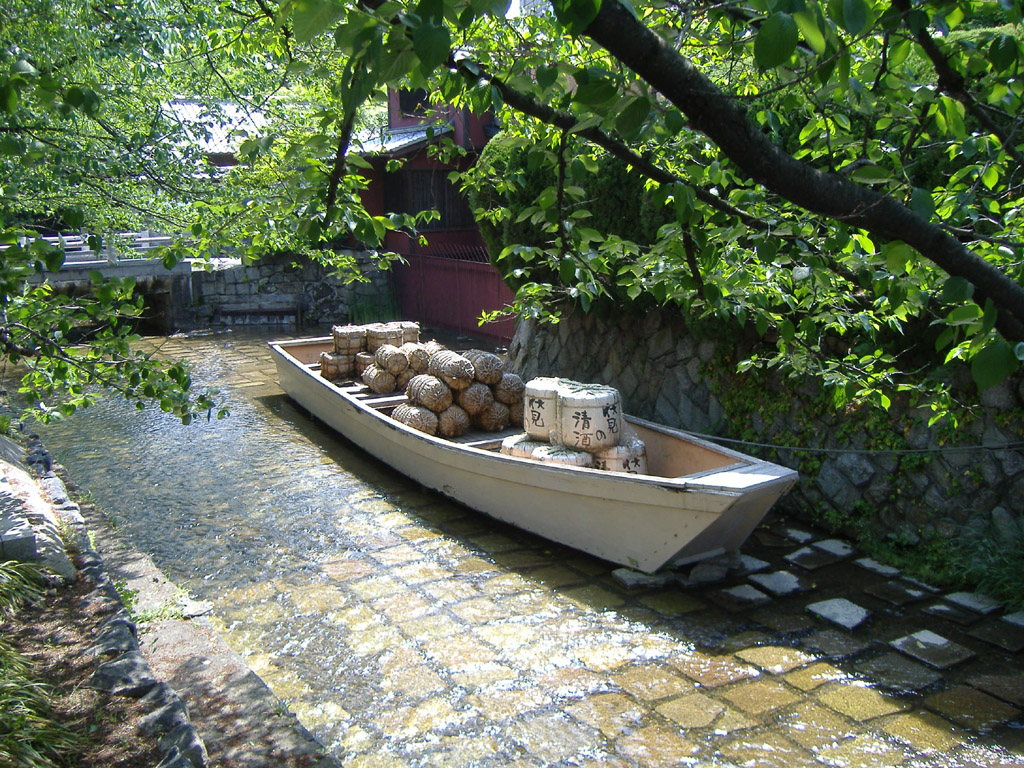
A boat on the Takase River in Kyoto, where the short story is set

"Takasebune" (高瀬舟; "The Boat on the Takase River") is a short story by the Japanese writer and illustrator Mori Ōgai, who is considered along with Natsume Sōseki to be one of the most important figures in modern Japanese literature. It is one of the author's best-known works. The plot concerns a boat that carried criminals from Kyoto to Osaka during the Edo period.

== Synopsis ==
One day, the police escort sent along to mind the prisoners as they journey along the Takase River is surprised to find that on this particular journey there will be only one prisoner, an unnervingly polite man named Kisuke who does not fit the stereotypical image of a criminal. The police escort is rattled but curious and asks why Kisuke seems so cheerful when the boat's usual passengers are sad. Kisuke replies that, unlike the majority of the boat's passengers, his previous life was so bad that he is sure that his life in exile will be an improvement. In addition, the money given him by the government to start a new life in exile is the largest sum of money he has ever had, and so he is quite content.

Intrigued, the police escort asks about Kisuke's crime. Kisuke says that his parents died young, orphaning him and his little brother. The brothers lived and worked together into young adulthood, when Kisuke's brother became so ill that he could no longer work. Kisuke was forced to work for both of them, incurring large debts. One day, he returned home to find that his brother had attempted to kill himself. Still alive, his brother begs for Kisuke to finish the job and put him out of his pain, explaining that he wanted to die so that he could no longer be a burden to his older brother.
