= Tokyu 5000 series =

Japanese train type

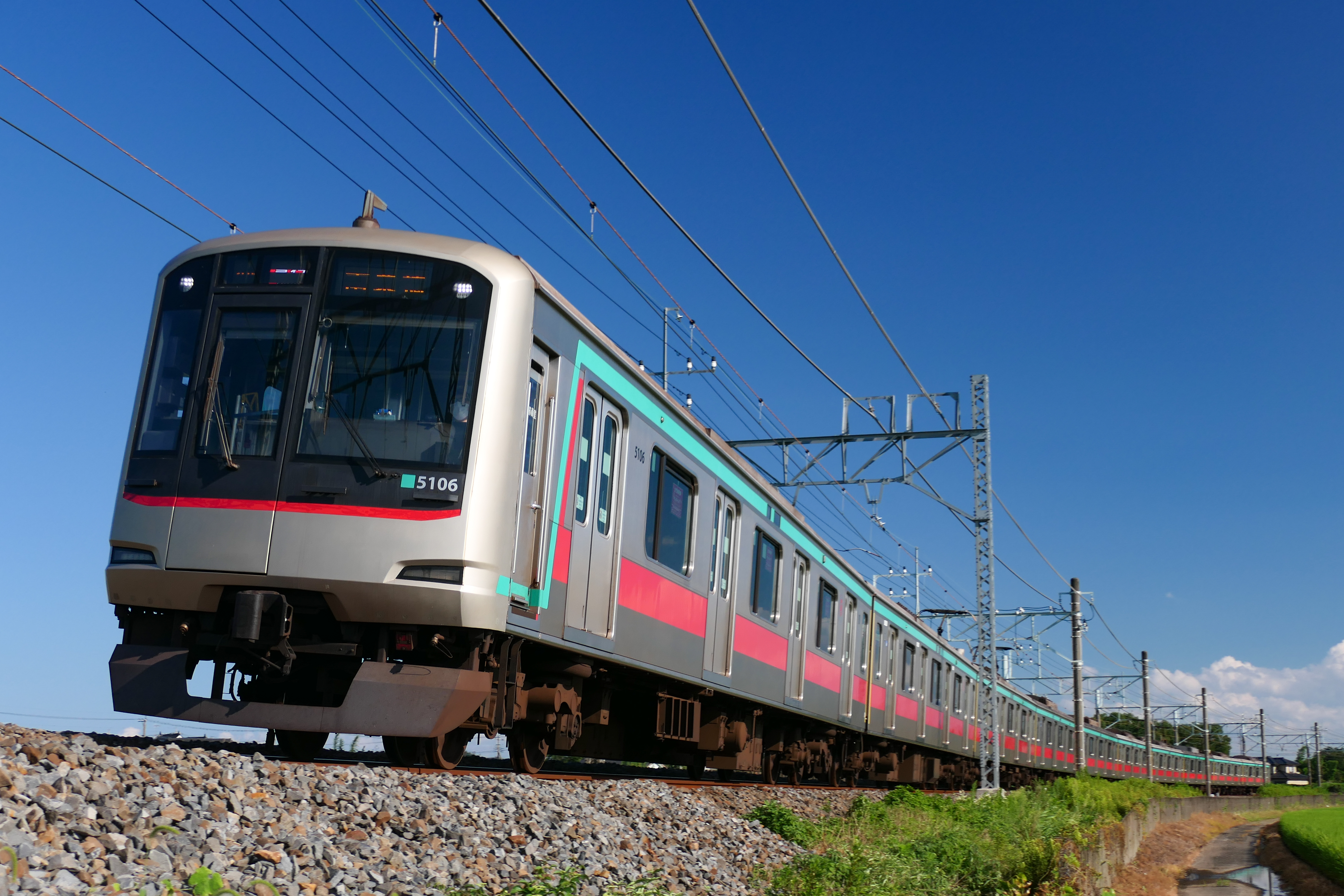
A Den-en-toshi Line 5000 series set in July 2021

The Tokyu 5000 series (東急5000系, Tōkyū 5000-kei) is an electric multiple unit (EMU) train type operated by the private railway operator Tokyu Corporation since 2002 on many of its commuter lines in the Tokyo area of Japan.

== Design ==
First introduced in 2002, the design is based on the JR East E231 series commuter train, also manufactured by Tokyu Car Corporation (now J-TREC) in Yokohama, from which all cars in this series would be produced.

All trains are equipped with interior LCD screens, displaying the station names, and automatic announcements in both Japanese and English. The 5000 series uses blue seat moquette fabric, while the 5050 and 5080 series have red seat moquette.

The design of the 5000 series was the basis for the later 6000 series and 7000 series train types.

== Driver's cab ==
All sets use the same driver's cab, with a gray color, and a single T-shaped brake and throttle controller. There are four throttle steps, and seven brake steps. The speedometers are equipped with ATC. To the right of the speedometer is an information screen, showing the run type (local, express, etc.), and information of the individual cars. This touch screen computer can also control interior temperature and lights.

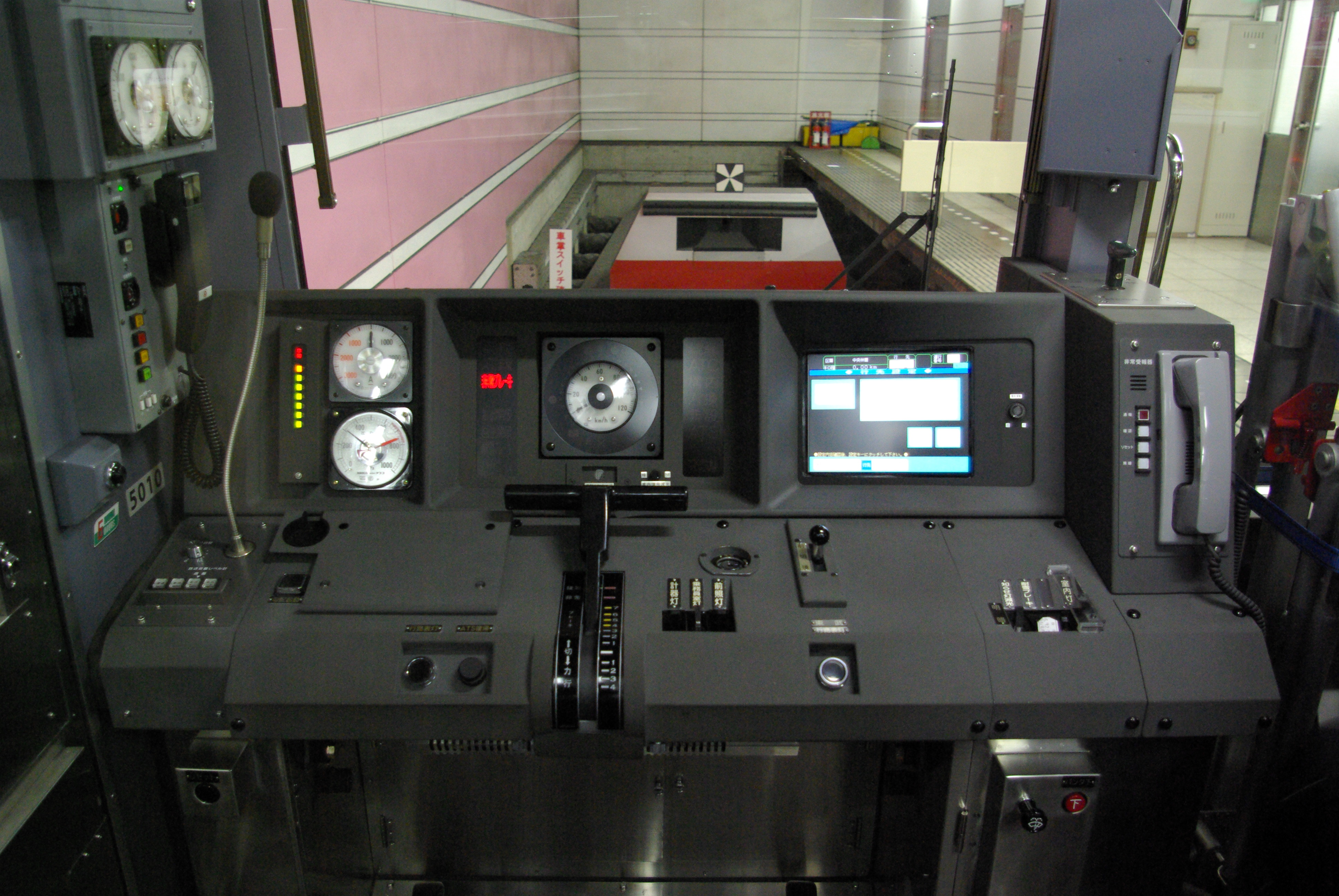
Driver's cab of the Tokyu 5000 series

== Variants ==
- 5000 series: 10-car sets used on the Tokyu Den-en-toshi Line since May 2002
- 5000 series: 8-car sets used on the Tokyu Toyoko Line
- 5050 series: 8-car sets used on the Tokyu Toyoko Line
- 5050-4000 series: 10-car sets used on Tokyu Toyoko Line inter-running services since September 2012
- 5080 series: 8-car (previously 6-car) sets used on the Tokyu Meguro Line since March 2003
- Y500 series: 8-car sets used on Minatomirai Line/Tokyu Toyoko Line inter-running services since February 2004

== 5000 series ==
Tokyu 5000 series
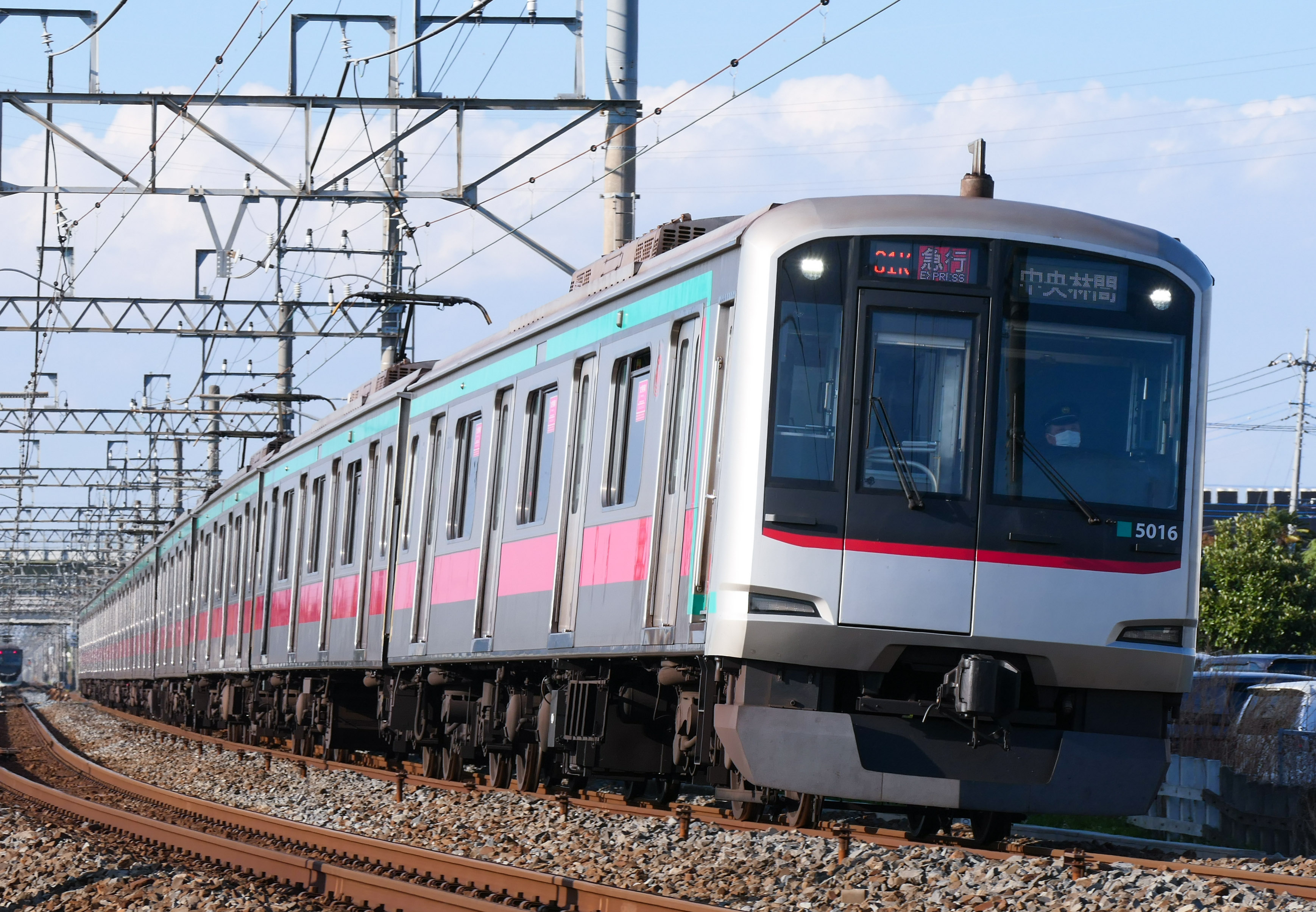
- Set 5116 on the Tobu Isesaki Line in April 2021
- Manufacturers: Tokyu Car Corporation, J-TREC
- Built at: Yokohama
- Replaced: Tokyu 8000 series
- Constructed: 2002–2017
- Entered service: 2002
- Refurbished: 2025–
- Number in service: 212 vehicles (22 sets, as of 1 April 2015)
- Number scrapped: 1 vehicle (accident damage)
- Formation: 8/10 cars per trainset
- Fleet numbers: 5101–5122
- Operator: Tokyu Corporation
- Depots: Nagatsuta Depot (Den-en-toshi Line); Motosumiyoshi Depot (Toyoko Line)
- Lines served: Tokyu Den-en-toshi Line; Tokyu Toyoko Line; Minatomirai Line; Tokyo Metro Hanzomon Line; Tobu Skytree Line; Tobu Isesaki Line; Tobu Nikko Line; Tokyo Metro Fukutoshin Line; Seibu Yurakucho Line; Seibu Ikebukuro Line; Tobu Tojo Line

Specifications
- Car body construction: Stainless steel
- Car length: 20,000 mm (65 ft 7 in)
- Width: Body width: 2,778 mm (9 ft 1.4 in) (Note: Set 5101's body width is 2,770 mm (9 ft 1 in)); Total width: 2,800 mm (9 ft 2 in)
- Doors: 4 pairs per side
- Maximum speed: 110 km/h (68 mph)
- Traction system: IGBT-VVVF inverter
- Power output: 190 kW (255 hp) per motor
- Acceleration: 3.3 km/(h⋅s) (2.1 mph/s)
- Deceleration: 3.5 km/(h⋅s) (2.2 mph/s) (service); 4.5 km/(h⋅s) (2.8 mph/s) (emergency)
- Electric system: 1,500 V DC Overhead wire
- Current collection: Pantograph
- Bogies: TS-1019A/TS-1020A
- Braking systems: Regenerative brakes, electronically controlled pneumatic brakes
- Safety systems: TASC, ATC
- Track gauge: 1,067 mm (3 ft 6 in)

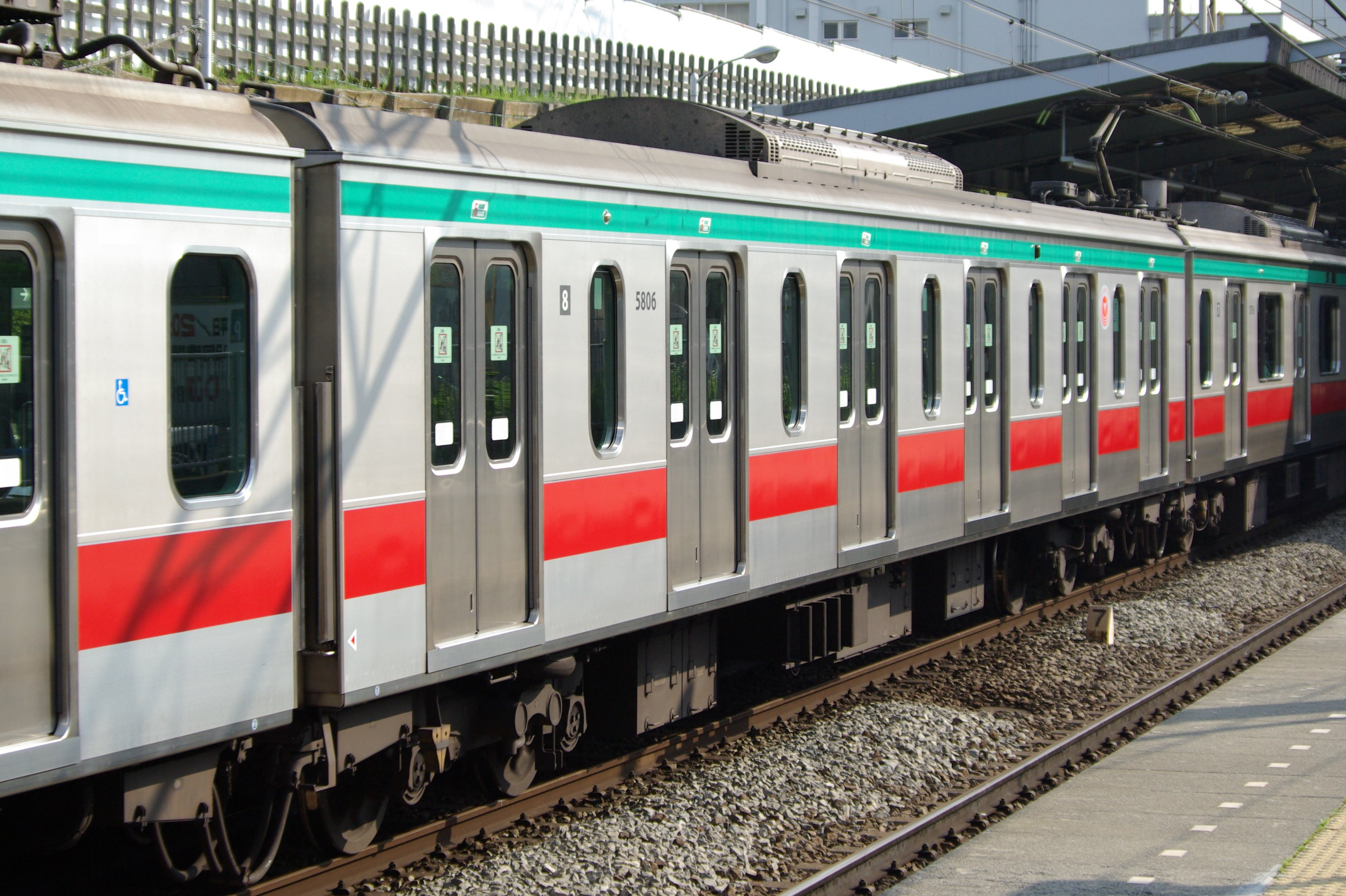
5000 series 6-door car

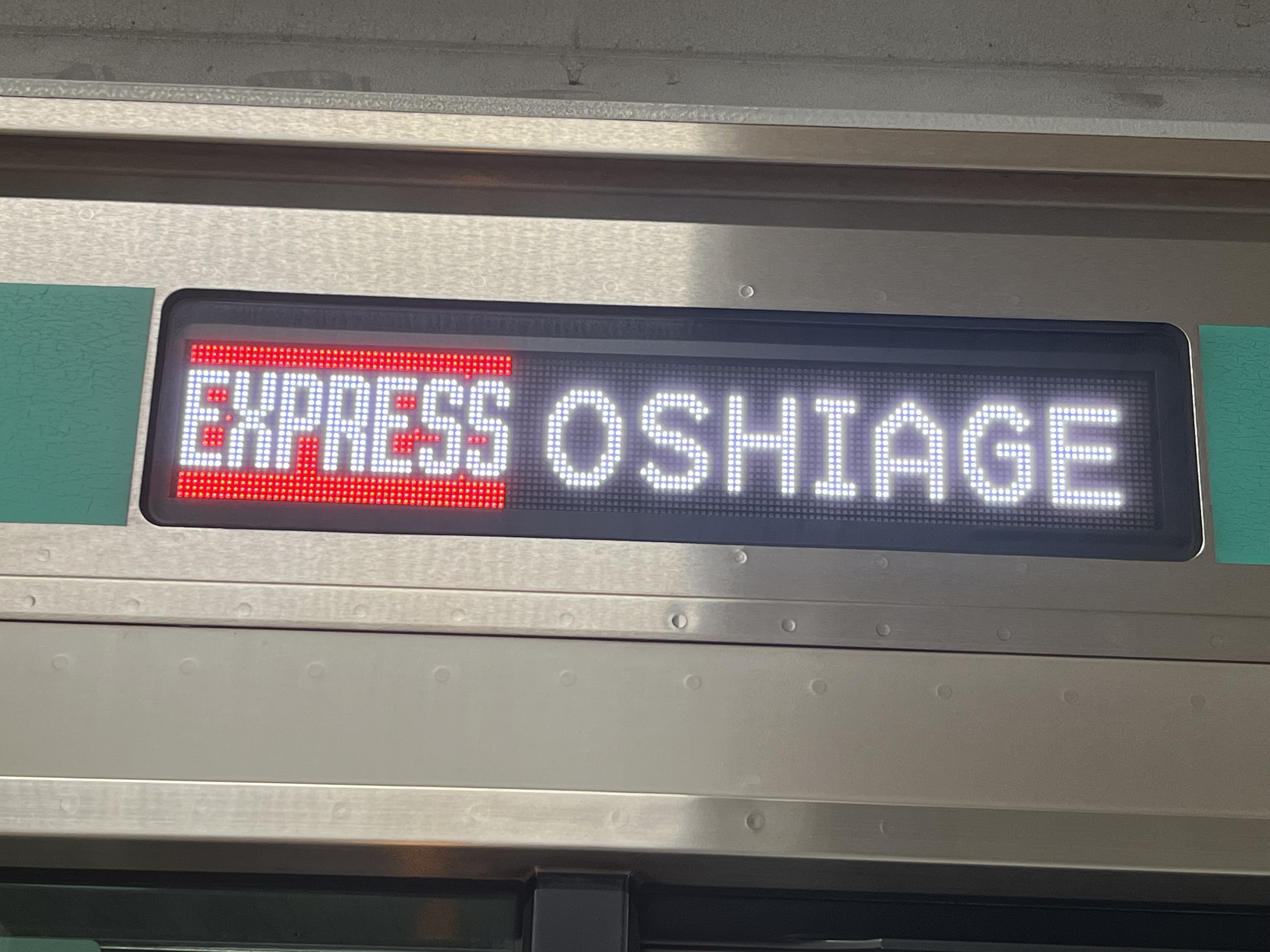
side destination display

These are ten-car sets first introduced on the Den-en-toshi Line from May 2002. These sets are distinguished by a green stripe above the doors. The 5000 series is fitted with CS-ATC and Tobu ATS (TSP) in order to run through the Tokyo Metro Hanzomon Line, and onward over the Tobu Skytree Line to Tōbu-Dōbutsu-Kōen, Tobu Isesaki Line to Kuki, and Tobu Nikko Line to Minami-Kurihashi. These sets are based at Tokyu's Nagatsuta depot, and are powered by Hitachi motors with VVVF inverters.

Initially six sets (5101–5106) were built between 2002 and 2003. Set 5101 was the prototype set and has slightly different dimensions (it is 8 mm (0.31 in) narrower than the other sets and has a slightly non-standard door spacing). Between 2005 and 2008, fourteen additional sets (5107–5117 and 5120–5122) were built with two six-door cars each (cars 5 and 8); sets 5117 and 5120–5122 were fully new built, while car 4 of sets 5107–5116 were surplus cars from sets 5102–5106, as two of their cars (5 and 8) were replaced with new six-door cars as well. Set 5122 never entered service on the Den-en-toshi Line. In early 2009, two additional sets (5118 and 5119) were built as 9-car sets (car 4 was missing, and cars 5 and 8 were six-door cars) but these also never entered into service.

Between 2009 and 2010, a third six-door car (car 4) was added to sets 5104–5117 and 5120 (total 15 sets): three cars were new built and 12 were taken from other sets (two cars each from sets 5102, 5103, 5118, 5119, 5121, and 5122). Of the 15 surplus four-door cars created, four were used to return sets 5102 and 5103 to fully four-door sets, six were inserted into sets 5118, 5119, 5121, and 5122, and the remaining five cars were used in 5050 series sets 5170–5172. Meanwhile, sets 5118, 5119, 5121, and 5122 were reformed as eight car sets and transferred to the Tōyoko Line. As mentioned earlier, nine-car sets 5118 and 5119 each had of their two six-door cars removed and replaced with two four-door surplus cars, and ten-car sets 5121 and 5122 each had two six-door cars replaced with a single four-door surplus car. In addition, a motored four-door car from each set was removed, and used in 5050 series sets 5169 and 5172–5174.

A total of 45 new four-door cars were built from December 2015 to replace the three six-door cars in sets 5104–5117 and 5120 to ensure uniform door-spacing ahead of the introduction of platform edge doors at Den-en-toshi Line stations from 2016. All six-door cars were replaced by the end of 2017. The new cars added incorporate a number of interior design improvements, including higher seat backs and headrests on some seats.

=== Operations ===
- ■ Tokyu Den-en-toshi Line
- ■ Tokyu Toyoko Line
- ■ Minatomirai Line
- ■ Tokyo Metro Hanzomon Line
- ■ Tobu Skytree Line
- ■ Tobu Isesaki Line
- ■ Tobu Nikko Line
- ■ Tokyo Metro Fukutoshin Line
- ■ Seibu Yurakucho Line
- ■ Seibu Ikebukuro Line
- ■ Tobu Tojo Line

=== Formations ===
The sets are formed as follows.

==== Den-en-toshi Line set 5101 ====
Car No.	1	2	3	4	5	6	7	8	9	10
Designation	Tc2	M	T3	M2	M1	T2	T1	M2	M1	Tc1
Numbering	5101	5201	5301	5401	5501	5601	5701	5801	5901	5001

The M1 cars (5 and 9) are each fitted with two single-arm pantographs, and the M car (2) is fitted with one pantograph.

==== Den-en-toshi Line sets 5102 onward ====
Car No.	1	2	3	4	5	6	7	8	9	10
Designation	Tc2	M2	M1'	T3N	T2N	M2	M1	T1N	M	Tc1
Numbering	5100	5200	5300	5400	5500	5600	5700	5800	5900	5000

The M1 cars (3 and 7) are each fitted with two single-arm pantographs, and the M car (9) is fitted with one pantograph.

==== Toyoko Line 8-car sets ====
Car No.	1	2	3	4	5	6	7	8
Designation	Tc2	M2	M1	T2	T1	M2	M1	Tc1
Numbering	5100	5200	5300	5400	5500	5600	5700	5800

The M1 cars (3 and 7) are each fitted with two single-arm pantographs.

=== Interior ===
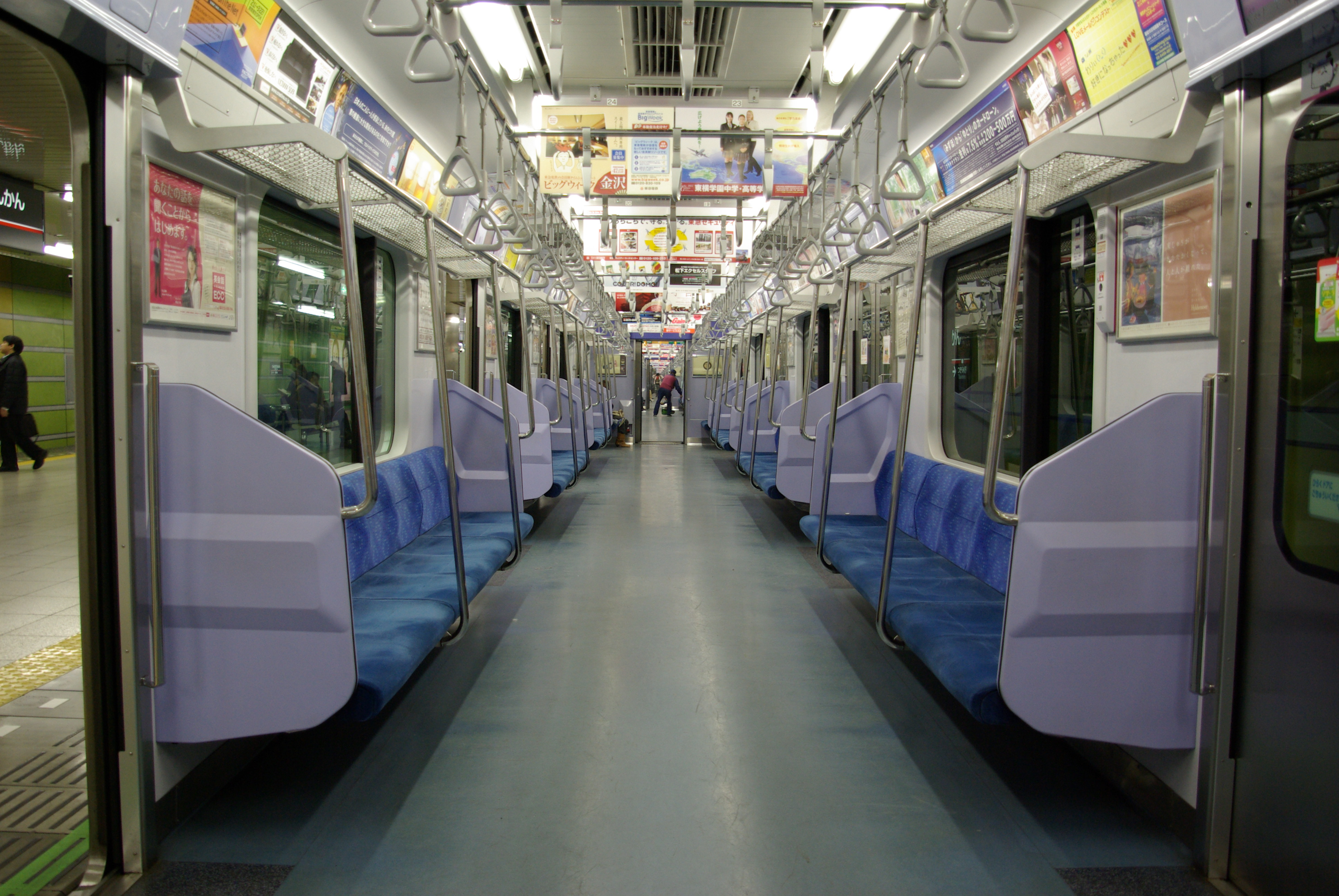
5000 series interior

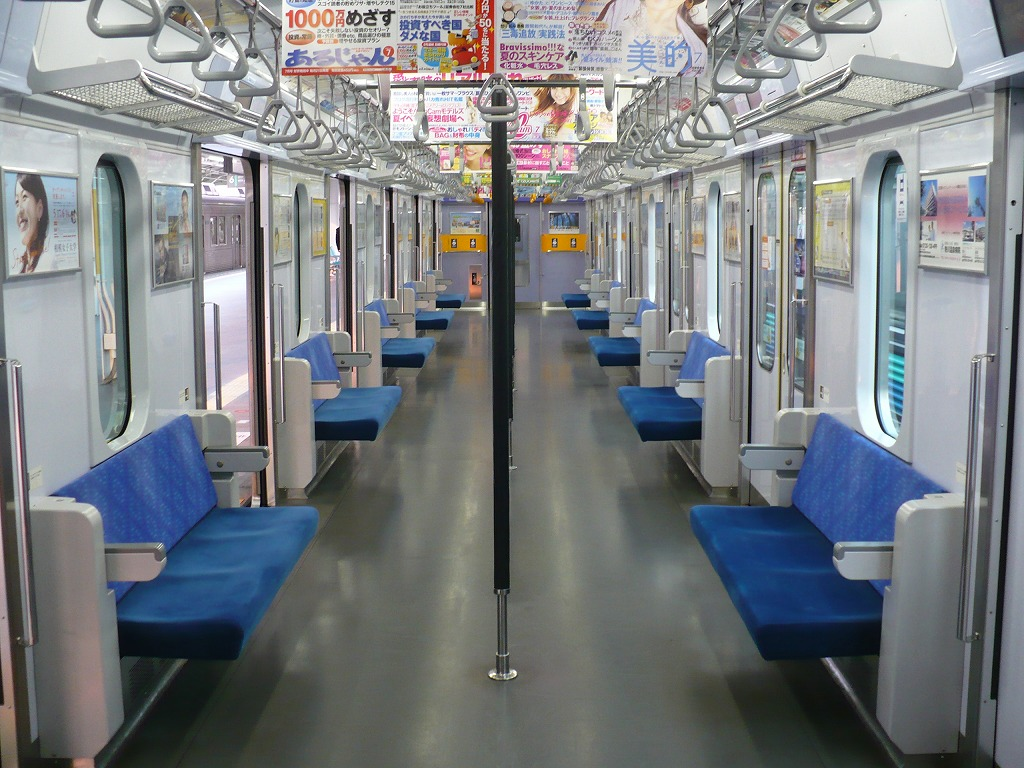
5000 series 6-door car interior

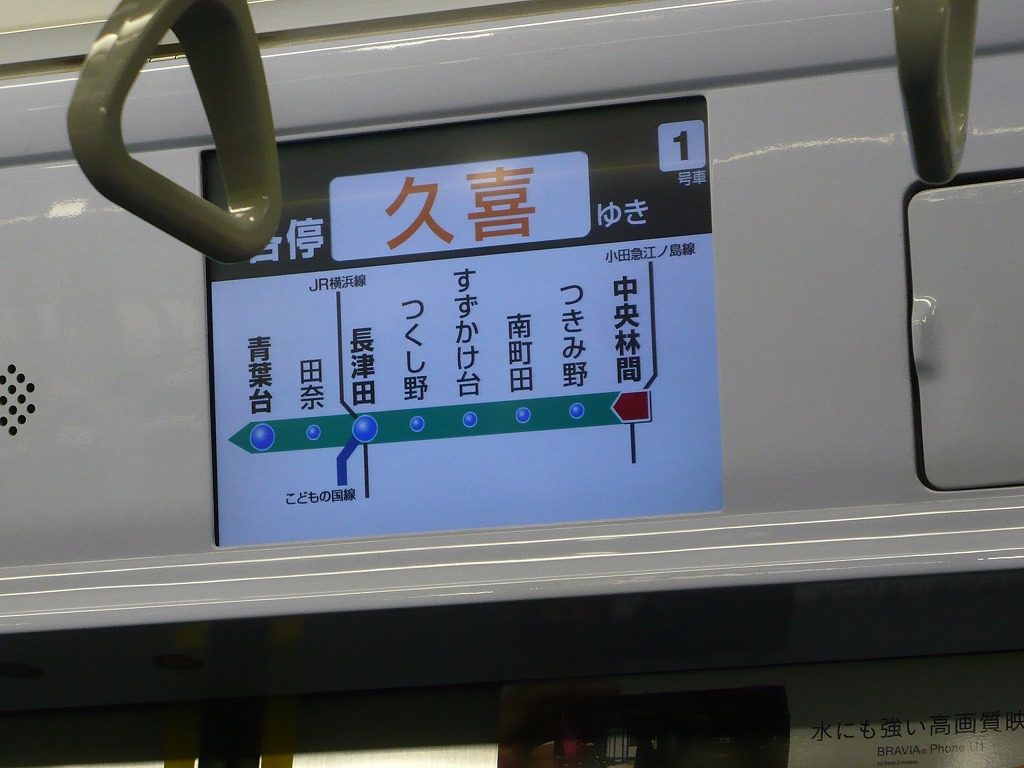
Passenger information screen

=== Refurbishment ===
On 8 May 2025, Tokyu Corporation announced its plans to refurbish its Den-en-toshi Line 5000 series fleet. Refurbished sets will carry a new livery and a redesigned interior based on that of the 2020 series, with new walls, seats, and flooring as well as additional wheelchair spaces. The first refurbished 5000 series set is scheduled to return to service in 2026.

=== Livery variations ===
==== Green frog ====
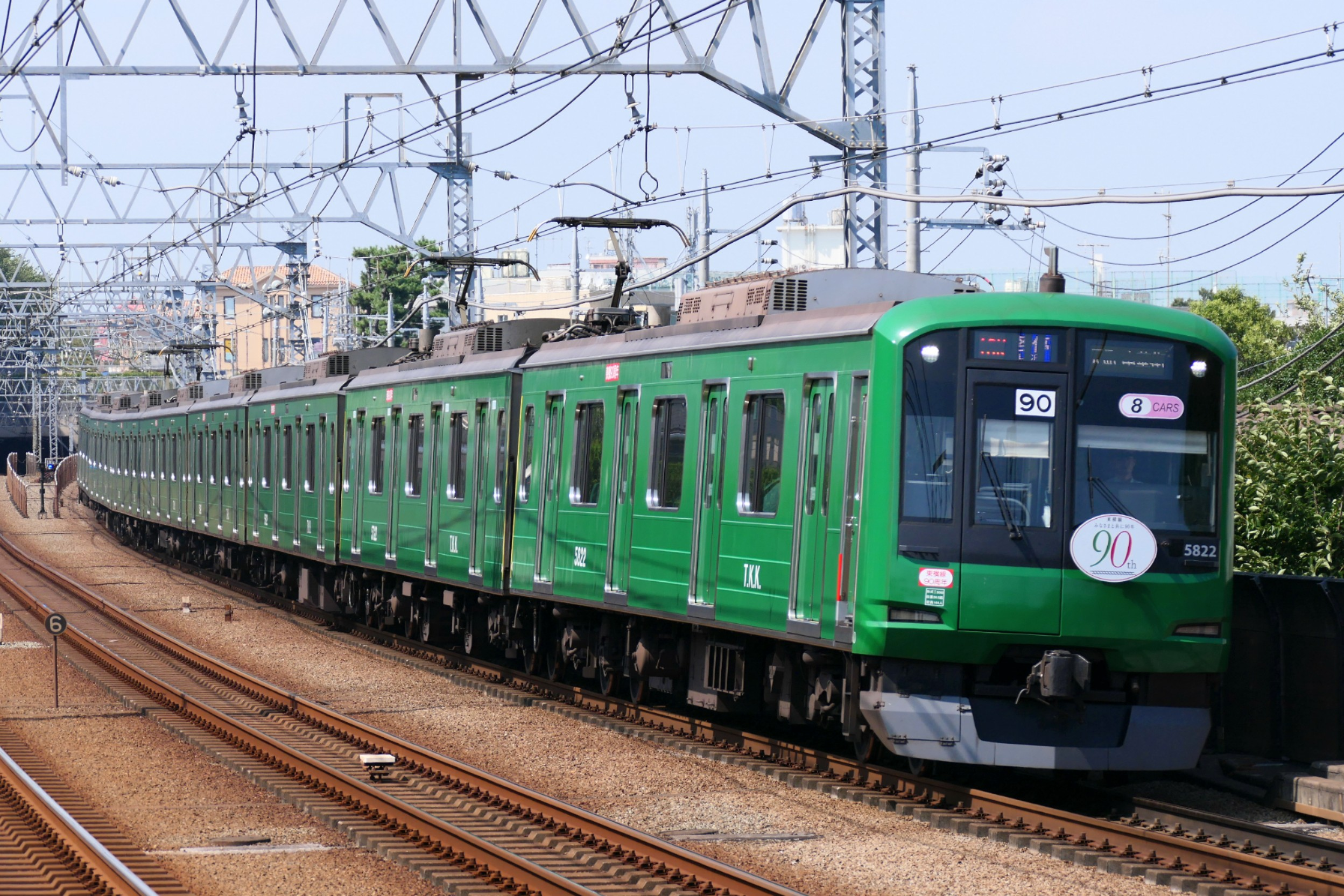
Toyoko Line 8-car 5000 series set 5122 in August 2019

Toyoko Line eight-car set 5122 received an all-over green vinyl wrapping livery in September 2017 to mark the 90th anniversary of the opening of the Toyoko Line and recreating the appearance of the original 5000 series EMUs nicknamed "green frog" which formerly operated on the line. It was originally scheduled to carry this livery until the end of August 2018, but this was later extended to August 2019 before Tokyu announced in September 2019 that the livery would be carried indefinitely.

== 5050 series ==
5050 series
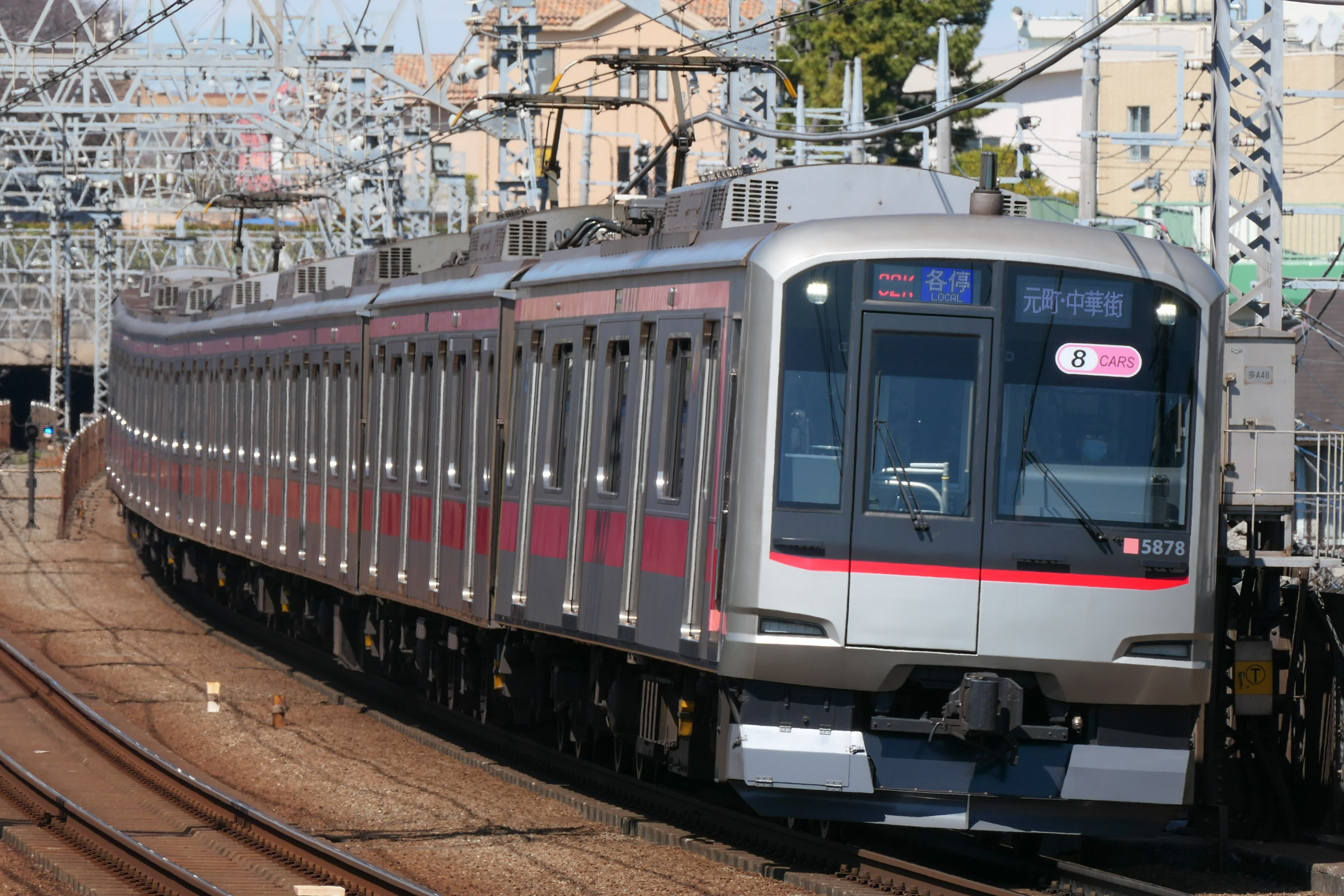
- A Toyoko Line 5050 series set in March 2021
- Manufacturers: Tokyu Car Corporation, J-TREC
- Built at: Yokohama
- Replaced: Tokyu 8000 series
- Constructed: 2004–2019 (Note: Some former 5000 series cars built in 2002–2003)
- Entered service: April 2004
- Number built: 224 vehicles (28 sets)
- Number in service: 200 vehicles (25 sets, as of 26 June 2020)
- Number scrapped: 8 vehicles (1 set) (accident damage)
- Formation: 8 cars per set
- Fleet numbers: 5151–5178
- Operator: Tokyu Corporation
- Depot: Motosumiyoshi
- Lines served: Tokyu Toyoko Line; Minatomirai Line; Tokyo Metro Fukutoshin Line; Seibu Yurakucho Line; Seibu Ikebukuro Line; Tobu Tojo Line

Specifications
- Car body construction: Stainless steel
- Car length: 20,200 mm (66 ft 3 in) (end cars); 20,000 mm (65 ft 7 in) (intermediate cars)
- Width: Body width: 2,798 mm (9 ft 2.2 in) (Note: Former 5000 series cars are 20 mm (0.79 in) narrower); Total width: 2,820 mm (9 ft 3 in)
- Height: 4,050 mm (13 ft 3 in)
- Doors: 4 pairs per side
- Maximum speed: 110 km/h (68 mph)
- Electric system: 1,500 V DC overhead lines
- Current collection: Single-arm pantograph
- Track gauge: 1,067 mm (3 ft 6 in)

These are eight-car sets introduced on the Toyoko Line from April 2004. These sets are distinguished by a pink stripe above the doors. They are similar to the 5000 series, the only difference being that they have eight cars, and that they have the pink stripe instead of green. They are based at Motosumiyoshi Depot, and are capable of running through the Minatomirai Line. The 5050 series is notable as being the first type of train in the world to feature full-color LED destination indicators.

Sets 5169–5174 each originally included one or two surplus 5000 series cars (5170–5172 had two surplus cars each, and the other sets had one); one car from sets 5169 and 5172–5174 were surplus motored cars with their pantographs and motored bogies temporarily removed, and were eventually replaced with new trailer cars while the motored cars were renumbered in the 4000 series.

Set 5155 was withdrawn in July 2017 following accident damage sustained in 2014, while set 5156 was transferred to Yokohama Minatomirai Railway in 2018 and renumbered Y517 to replace set Y516 damaged in the same accident. New build sets 5177 and 5178 were delivered from J-TREC in 2016 and 2019 respectively as replacement trains.

In 2020, set 5173 was reformed as a 10-car set and renumbered as set 4111. Furthermore, in 2022, set 5166 was reformed as a 10-car set and features two "Q Seat" cars (numbered cars 4 and 5 within the set) in preparation for "Q Seat" services on the Toyoko Line. Set 5166 was renumbered to 4112. Following the completion of newly formed 4112, it was announced that three more sets (sets 5167–5169) will be reformed into 10-car trainsets for service on the Sotetsu-Tokyu Link. Once reformed, they will be numbered 4113–4115 respectively. The first "Q Seat" cars entered service on the Toyoko Line on 24 October 2022; however "Q Seat" services only began on 10 August 2023.

=== Operations ===
- ■ Tokyu Toyoko Line
- ■ Minatomirai Line
- ■ Tokyo Metro Fukutoshin Line
- ■ Seibu Yurakucho Line
- ■ Seibu Ikebukuro Line
- ■ Tobu Tojo Line (between Wakoshi and Shiki)

=== Formation ===
Toyoko Line eight-car sets are formed as follows.

Car No.	1	2	3	4	5	6	7	8
Designation	Tc2	M2	M1	T2	T1	M2	M1	Tc1
Numbering	5150	5250	5350	5450	5550	5650	5750	5850

The M1 cars (3 and 7) are each fitted with two single-arm pantographs.

=== Interior ===
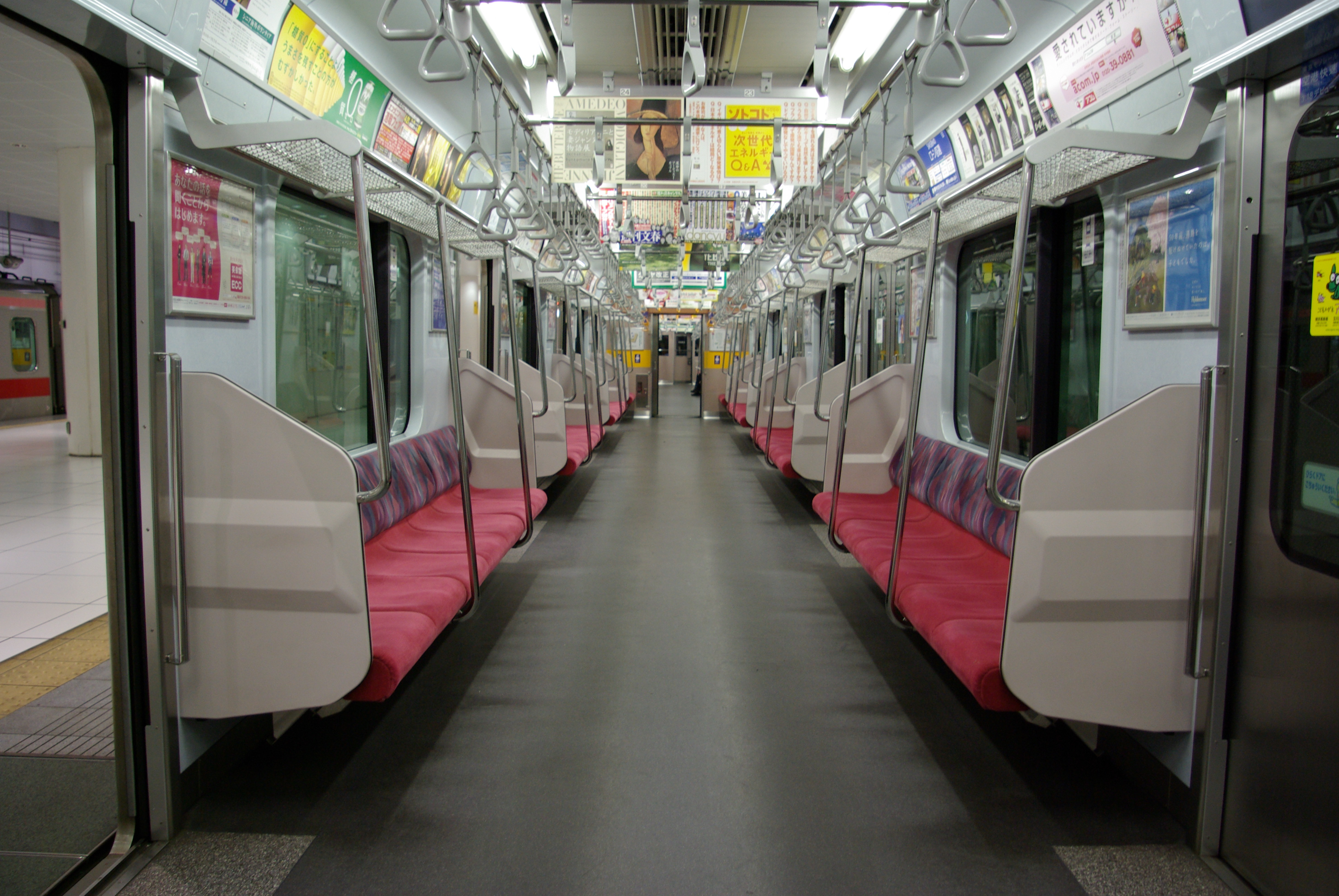
5050 series interior

=== Sustina prototype car ===
J-TREC is testing a prototype car based on the sustina design, as part of a Toyoko Line 5050 series set. The car, numbered 5576, is part of set 5176.

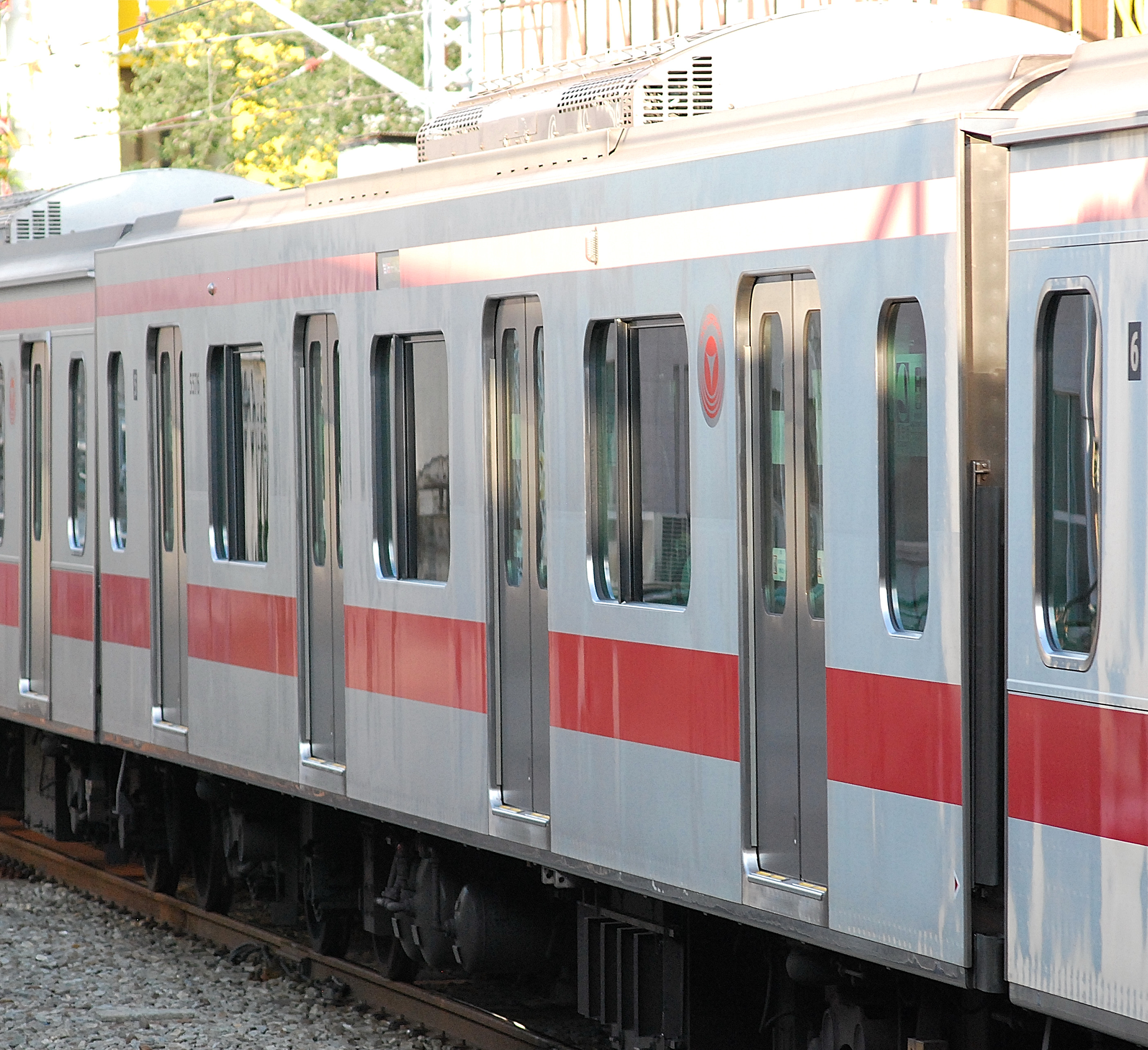
Sustina car 5576 in September 2013

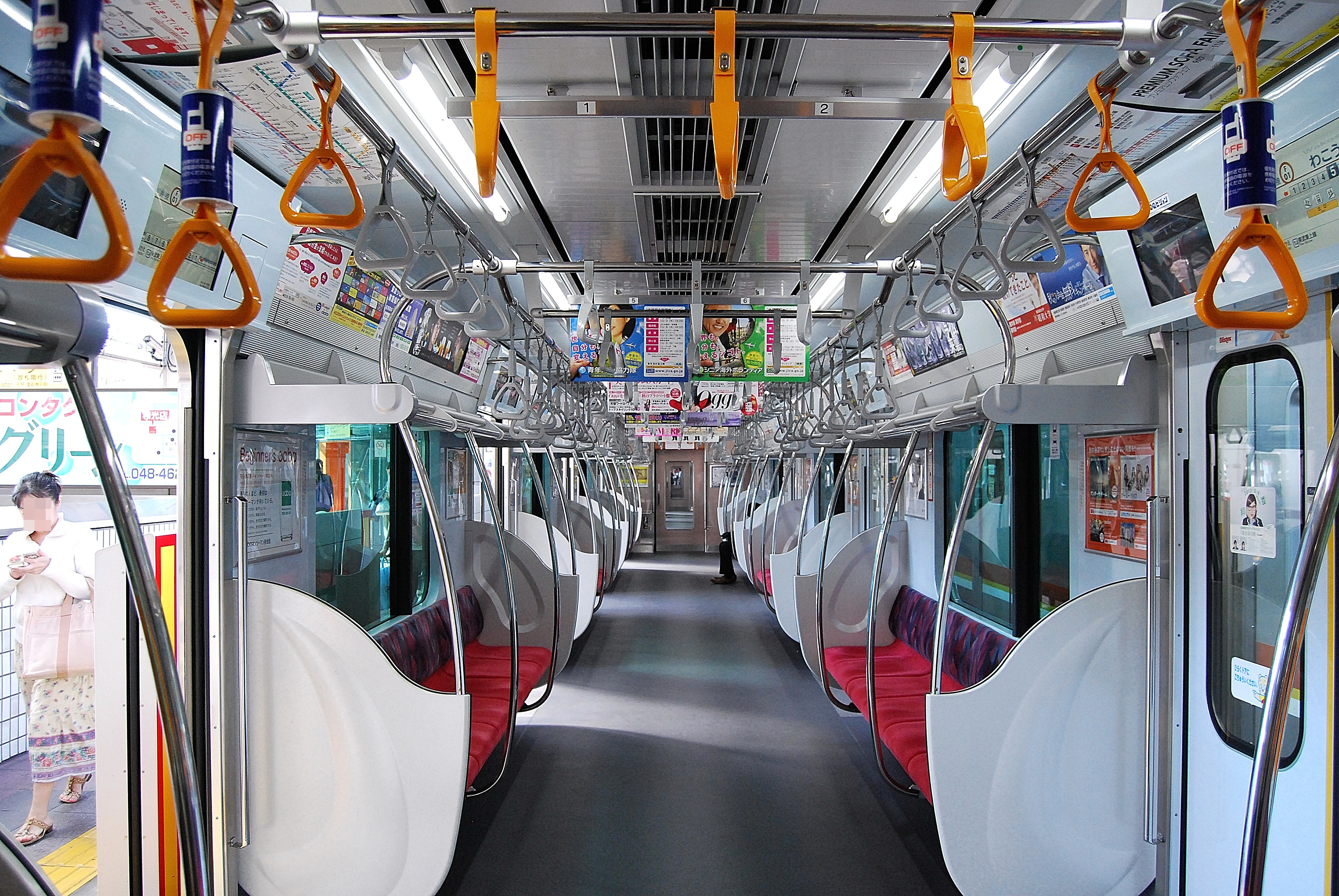
Interior of the sustina car

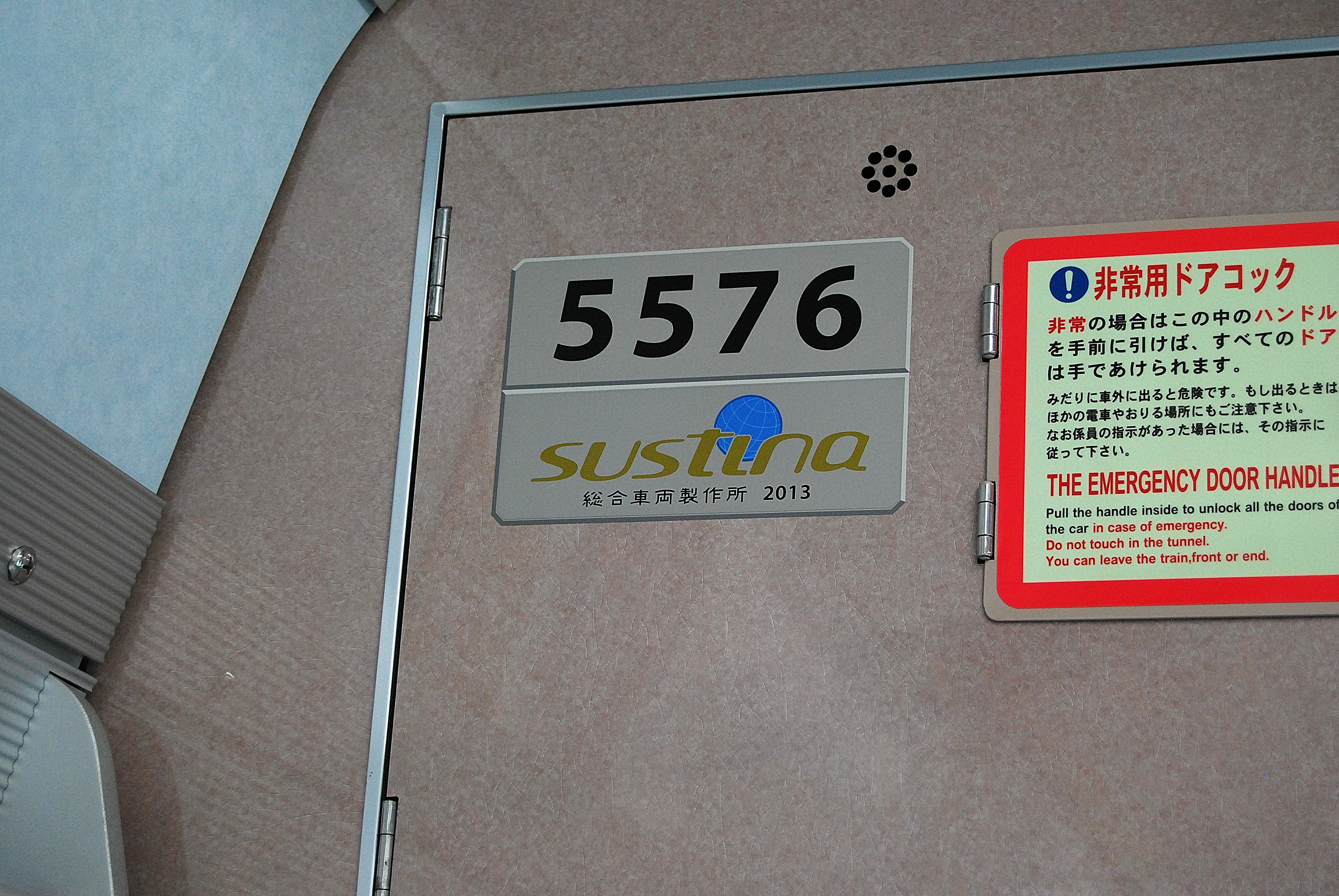
Manufacturer's plate

=== Refurbishment ===
On 8 May 2025, Tokyu Corporation announced its plans to refurbish twenty-three 5050 series sets. Refurbished sets will carry a new livery and a redesigned interior based on that of the 2020 series, with new walls, seats, and flooring as well as additional wheelchair spaces. The first refurbished 5050 series set is scheduled to return to service in the final quarter of 2025.

=== Livery variations ===
==== 100th anniversary ====
From 10 April 2022, set 5151 received a special livery to commemorate the 100th anniversary of Tokyu Corporation's founding.

== 5050-4000 series ==
5050-4000 series
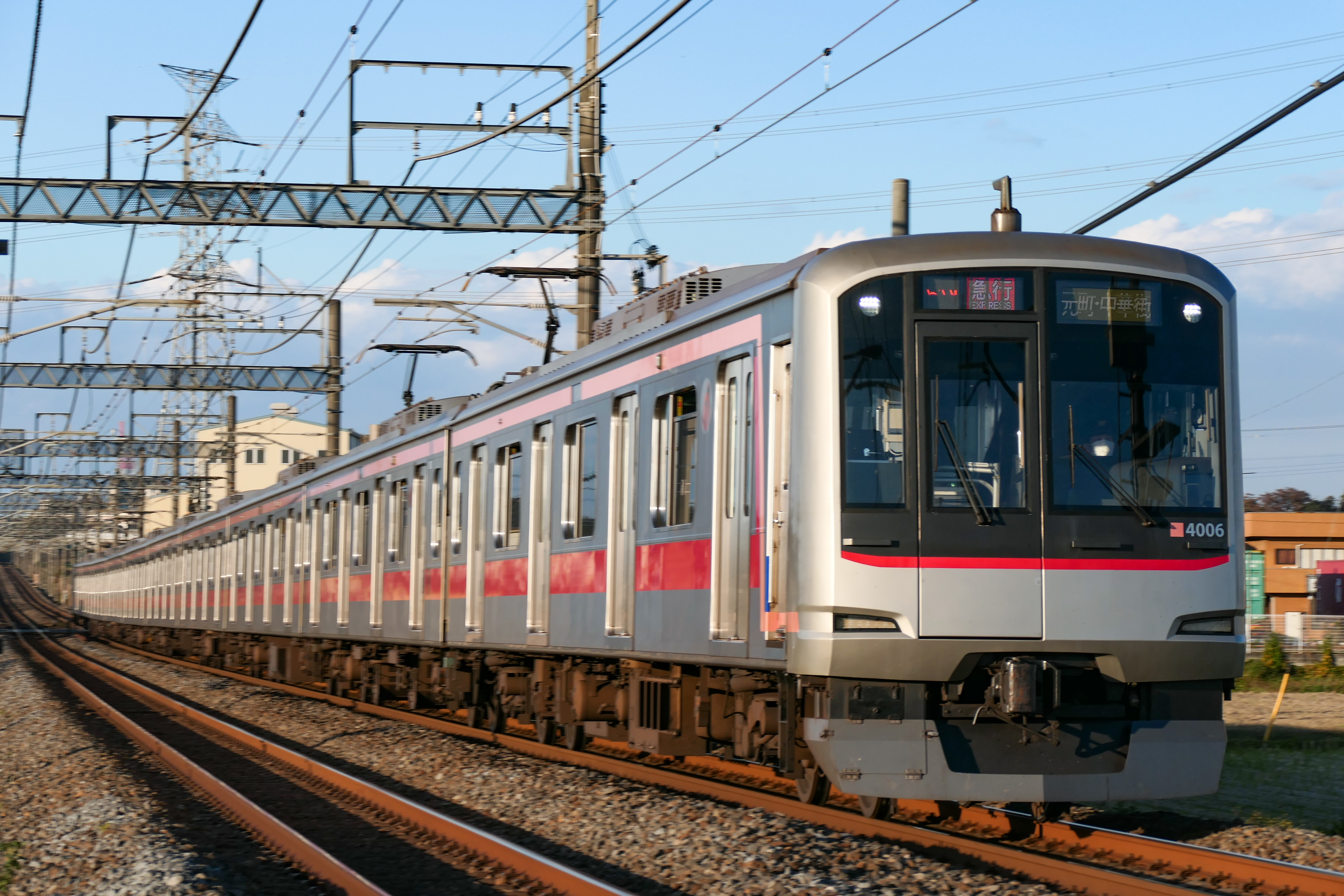
- Set 4106 on the Tobu Tojo Line in November 2021
- Manufacturers: Tokyu Car Corporation (4101–4107), J-TREC (4108–4110)
- Built at: Yokohama
- Constructed: 2011–2019, 2022 (Note: Former 5000 series cars built in 2008–2009, and former 5050 series cars built in 2010)
- Entered service: September 2012
- Number in service: 150 vehicles (15 sets)
- Formation: 10 cars per set
- Fleet numbers: 4101–4115
- Operator: Tokyu Corporation
- Depot: Motosumiyoshi
- Lines served: Tokyu Toyoko Line; Minatomirai Line; Tokyo Metro Fukutoshin Line; Seibu Yurakucho Line; Seibu Ikebukuro Line; Tobu Tojo Line; Tokyu Shin-Yokohama Line; Sotetsu Shin-Yokohama Line; Sotetsu Main Line; Sotetsu Izumino Line

Specifications
- Car body construction: Stainless steel
- Car length: 20,200 mm (66 ft 3 in) (end cars); 20,000 mm (65 ft 7 in) (intermediate cars)
- Width: Body width: 2,798 mm (9 ft 2.2 in) (Note: Set 4110 and former 5000 series cars are 20 mm (0.79 in) narrower); Total width: 2,820 mm (9 ft 3 in)
- Height: 4,050 mm (13 ft 3 in)
- Doors: 4 pairs per side
- Maximum speed: 120 km/h (75 mph)
- Power output: 190 kW (255 hp) x 4 per motored car
- Acceleration: 3.3 km/(h⋅s) (2.1 mph/s)
- Deceleration: 3.5 km/(h⋅s) (2.2 mph/s) (service); 4.5 km/(h⋅s) (2.8 mph/s) (emergency)
- Electric system: 1,500 V DC Overhead line
- Current collection: Pantograph
- Bogies: TS-1019A (motored); TS-1020A (trailer)
- Safety systems: ATC-P/S, Tobu ATS, Seibu ATS
- Track gauge: 1,067 mm (3 ft 6 in)

New 5050-4000 series 10-car sets based on the 5050 series design were delivered from Tokyu Car from April 2011, entering service from September 2012 ahead of the start of Tokyu Toyoko Line and Tokyo Metro Fukutoshin Line inter-running services in March 2013.

=== Operations ===
- ■ Tokyu Toyoko Line
- ■ Minatomirai Line
- ■ Tokyo Metro Fukutoshin Line (since 10 September 2012)
- ■ Seibu Yurakucho Line (since 10 September 2012)
- ■ Seibu Ikebukuro Line (since 10 September 2012)
- ■ Tobu Tojo Line (since 10 September 2012)
- ■ Tokyu Shin-Yokohama Line (since 18 March 2023)
- ■ Sotetsu Shin-Yokohama Line (since 18 March 2023)
- ■ Sotetsu Main Line (since 18 March 2023)
- ■ Sotetsu Izumino Line (since 18 March 2023)

=== Formations ===
The ten-car sets are formed as follows.

Car No.	1	2	3	4	5	6	7	8	9	10
Designation	Tc2	M2'	M1	T3	T2	M	T1	M2	M1'	Tc1
Numbering	4100	4200	4300	4400	4500	4600	4700	4800	4900	4000
Weight (t)	27.8	32.7	33.6	26.3	26.1	33.5	26.5	32.7	33.5	27.6
Capacity (Seated/total)	48/141	51/151	54/152						51/151	48/141

- The M1 and M1' cars each have two single-arm pantographs, and the M car is fitted with one.
- Cars 4601 to 4604 (included in sets 4101 to 4104 respectively) were renumbered from former 5050 series cars 5469, 5473, 5474, and 5472 (from sets 5169, 5173, 5174, and 5172 respectively), which were in turn from former Den-en-toshi Line 5000 series cars 5918, 5919, 5922, and 5921 (from sets 5118, 5119, 5122, and 5121 respectively); they are 20 mm (0.79 in) narrower and retain their original blue moquette seating.

=== Interior ===
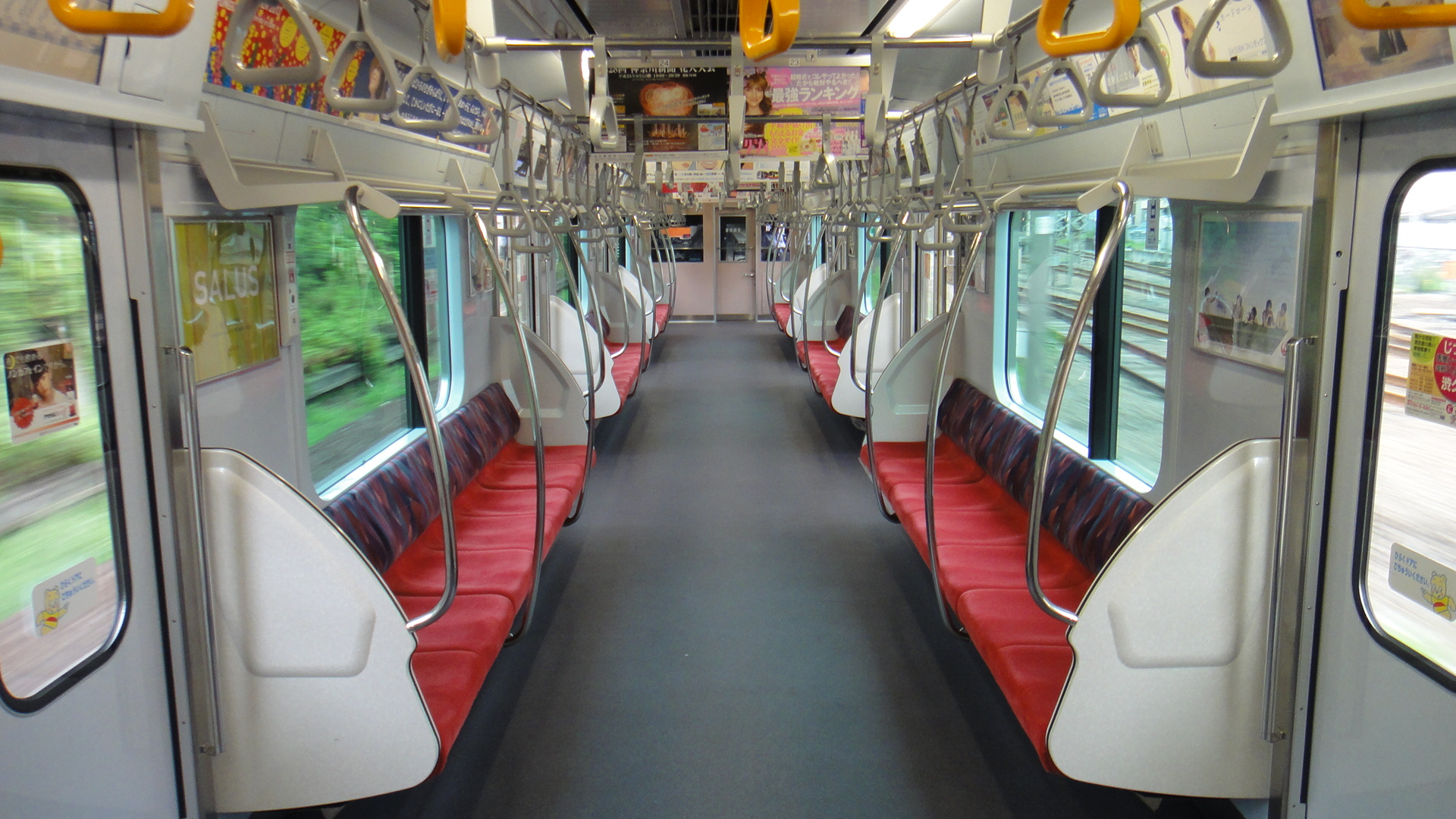
Interior view of car 4008 in July 2013

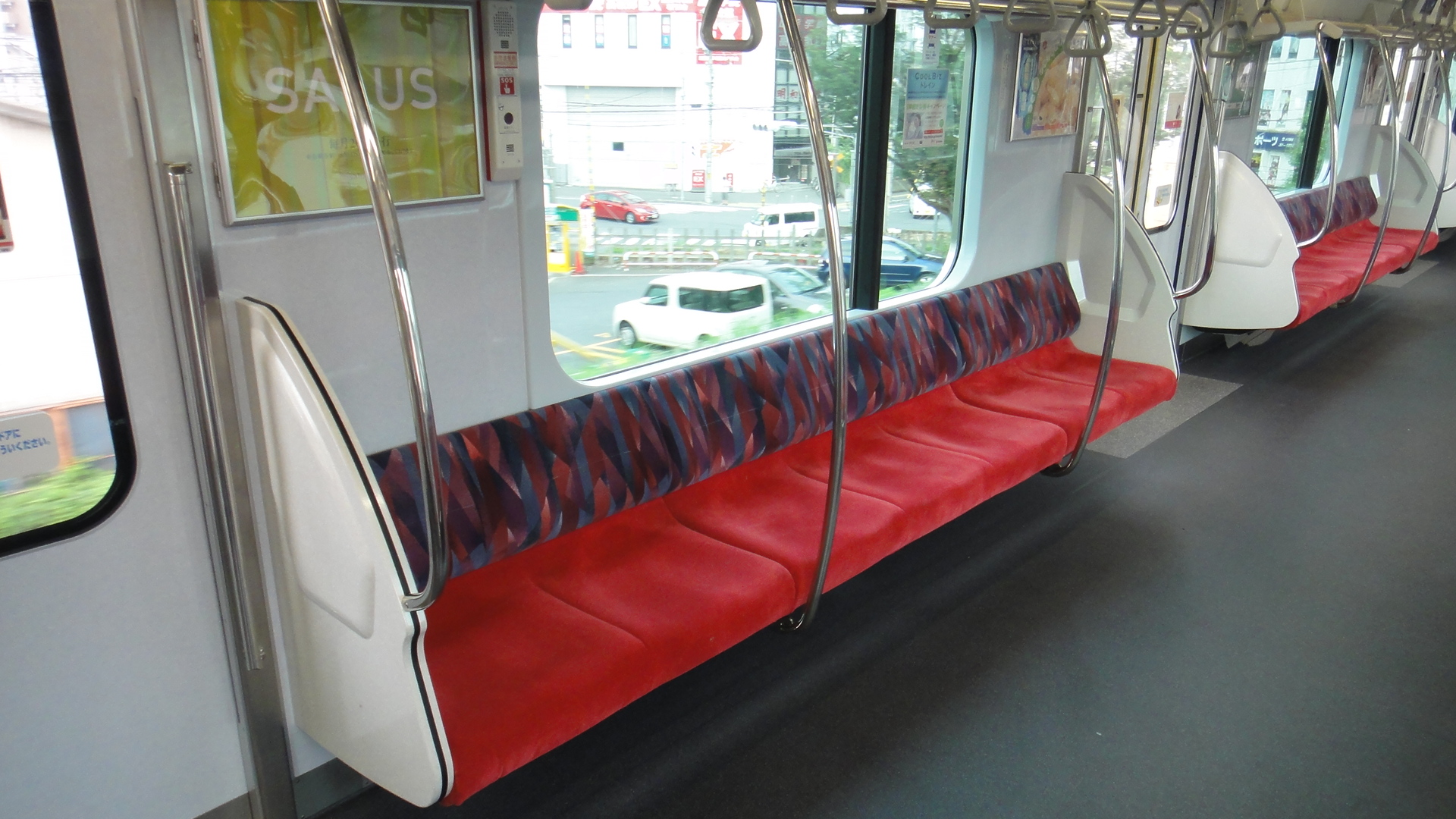
7-person bench seating in July 2013

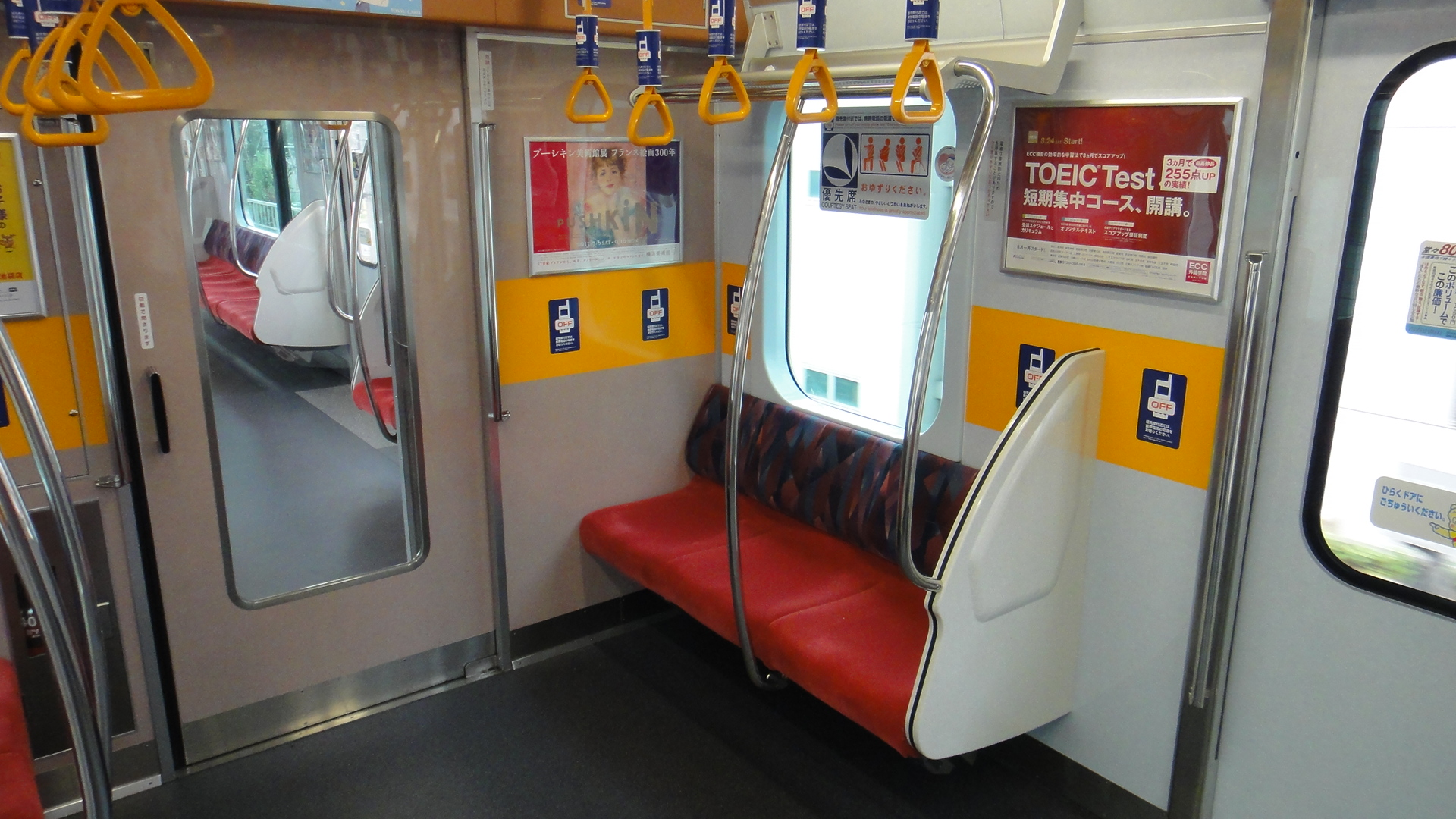
Priority seating in car 4008 in July 2013

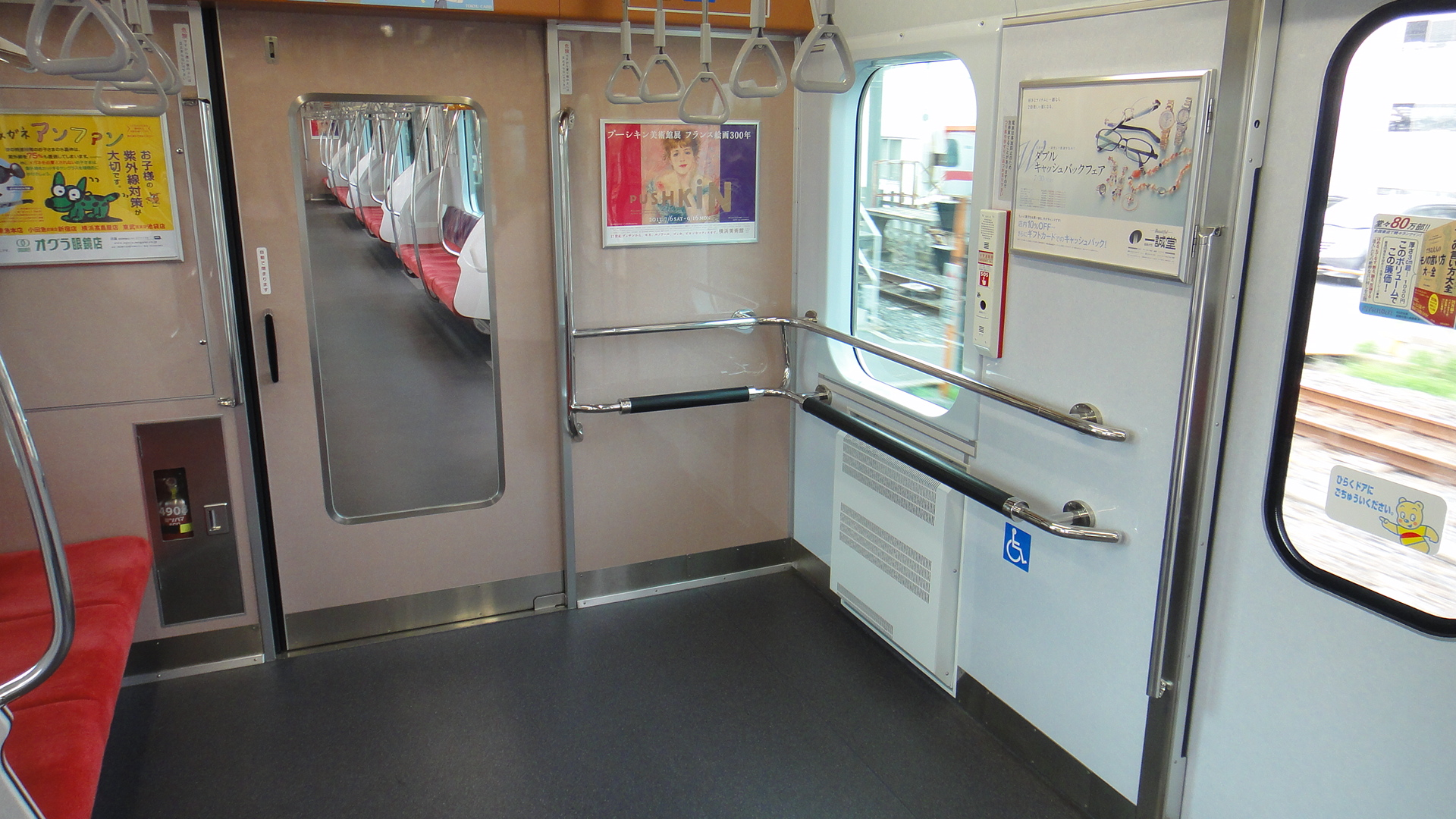
Wheelchair space in car 4908

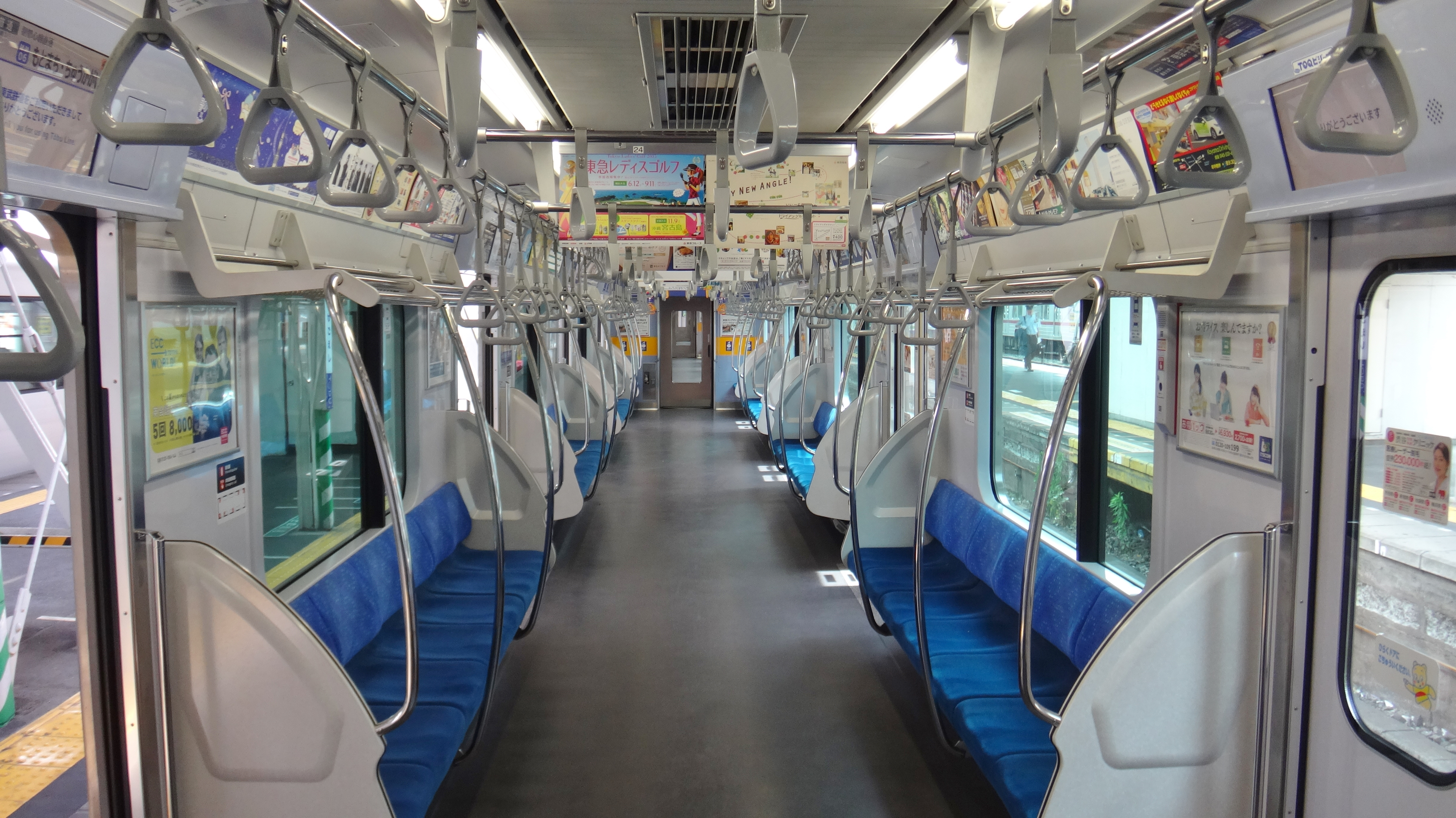
The interior of car 4601 (formerly 5000 series car 5918) with original blue seating moquette

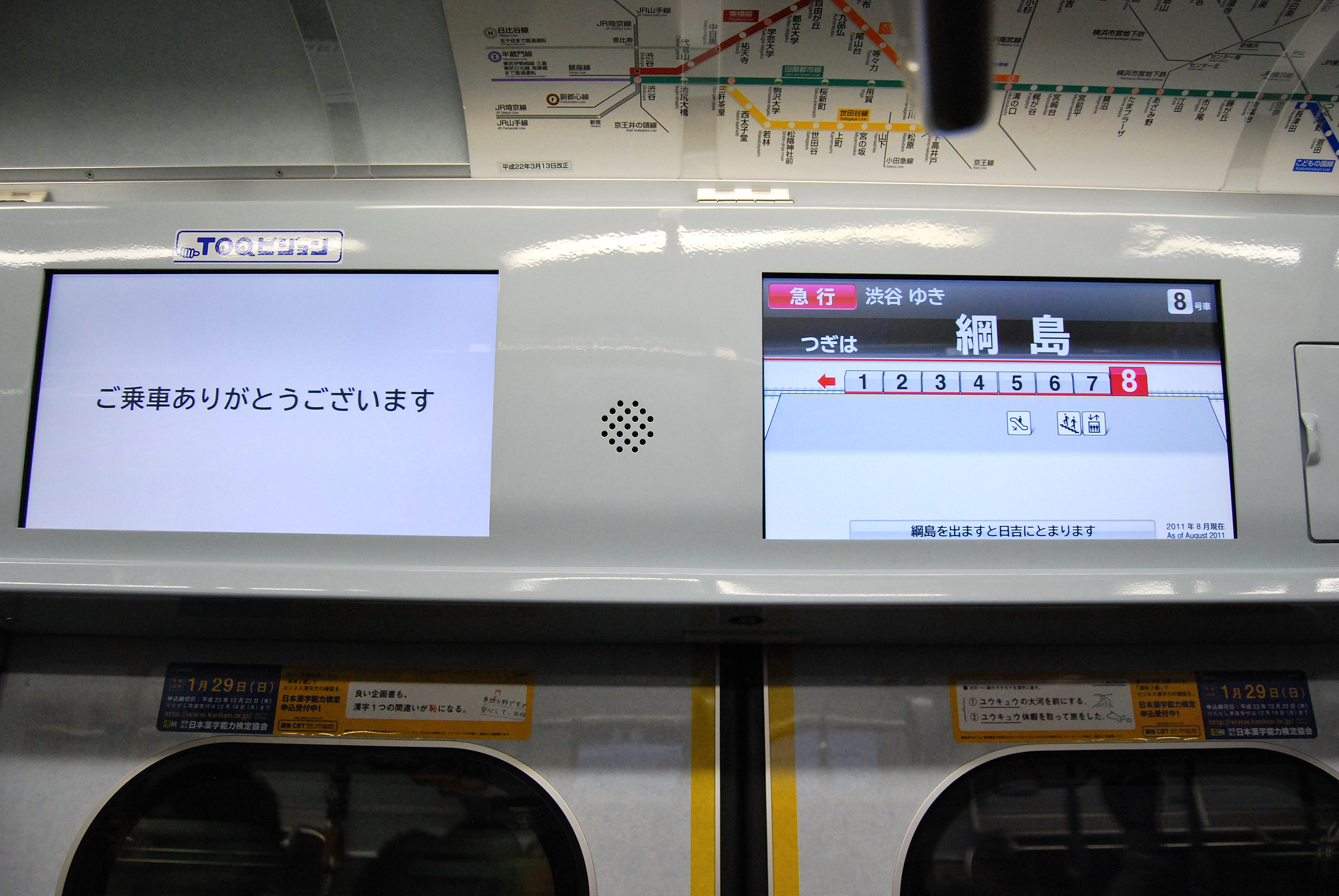
LCD passenger information screens above the doorways in December 2011

=== Shibuya Hikarie ===
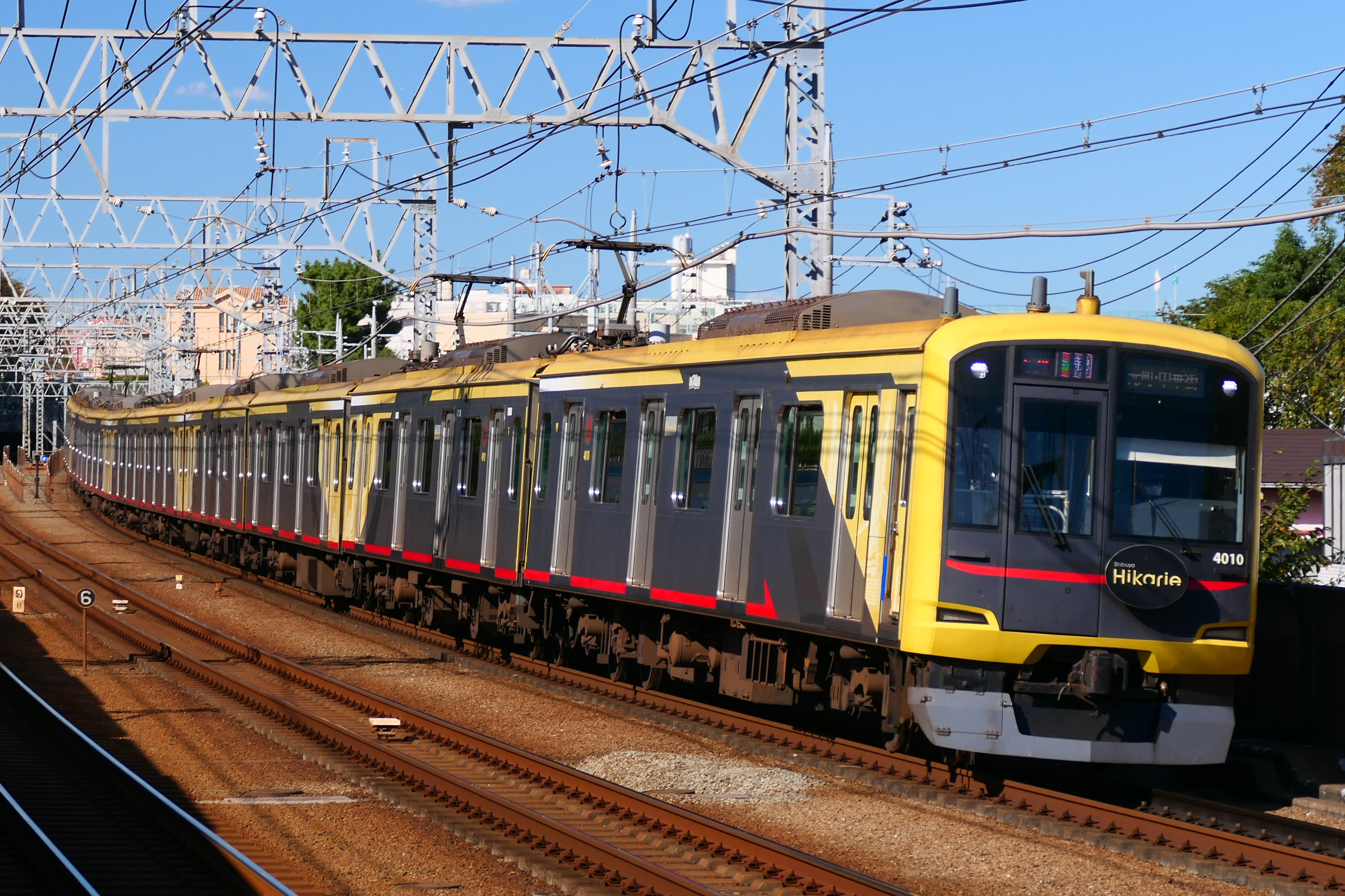
Shibuya Hikarie set 4110 in October 2022

Set number 4110 was delivered in April 2013 in a special Shibuya Hikarie body graphics and with modified interior to mark the first anniversary of Tokyu's "Shibuya Hikarie" development located above the newly expanded underground Shibuya Station. This trainset entered revenue service on 26 April 2013. It is the first 5050 series train to feature LED interior lighting, and has higher backed seating than regular trains, with grey seat backs in cars 1, 3, 8, and 10, brown seat backs in cars 2, 4, 6, and 9, and blue seat backs in cars 5 and 7. The train is equipped experimentally with free WiFi. One stanchion in the train features an embossed heart design as a whimsical way to brighten up commuters' journeys.

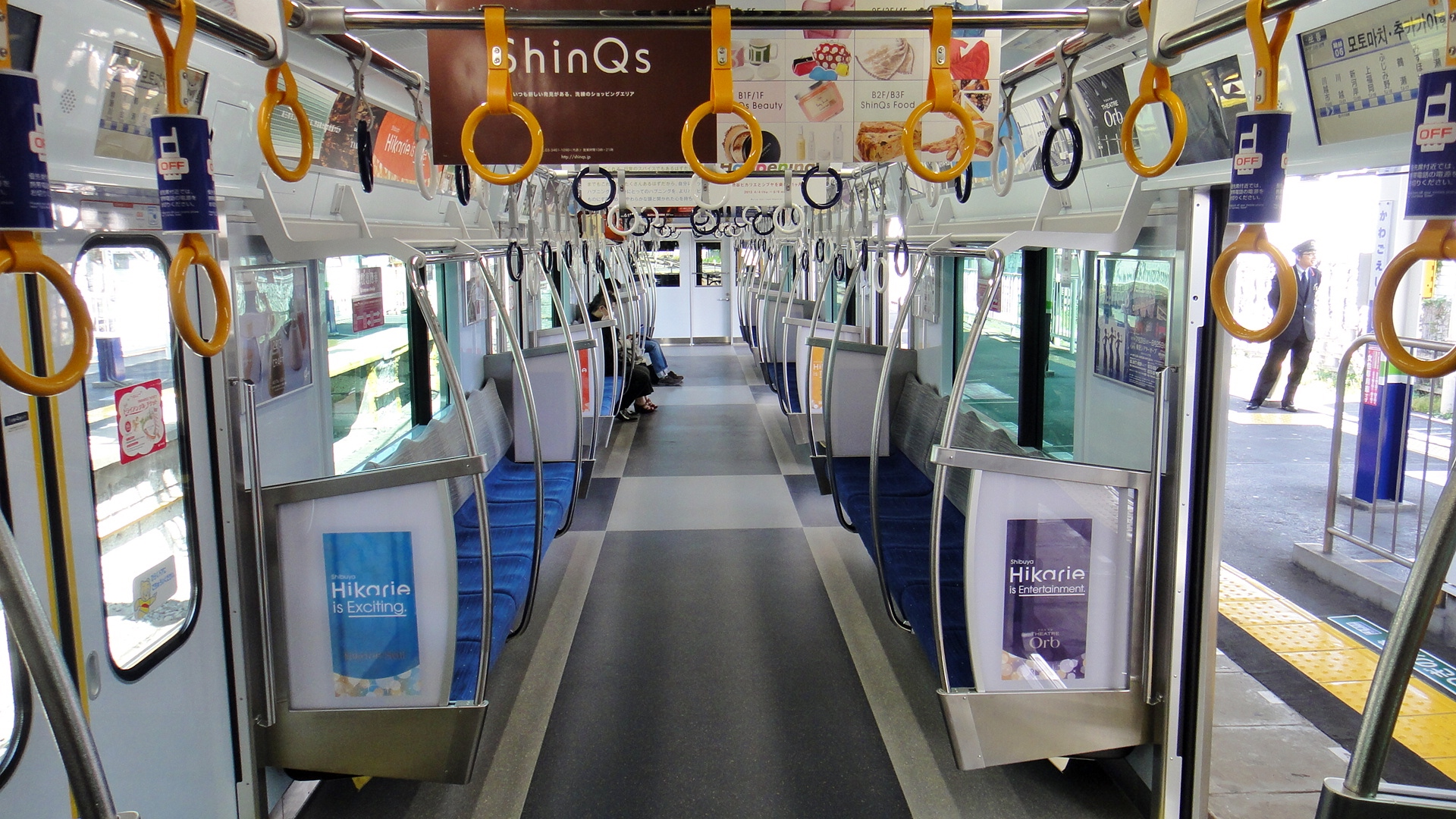
Interior of car 4110 (car 1)

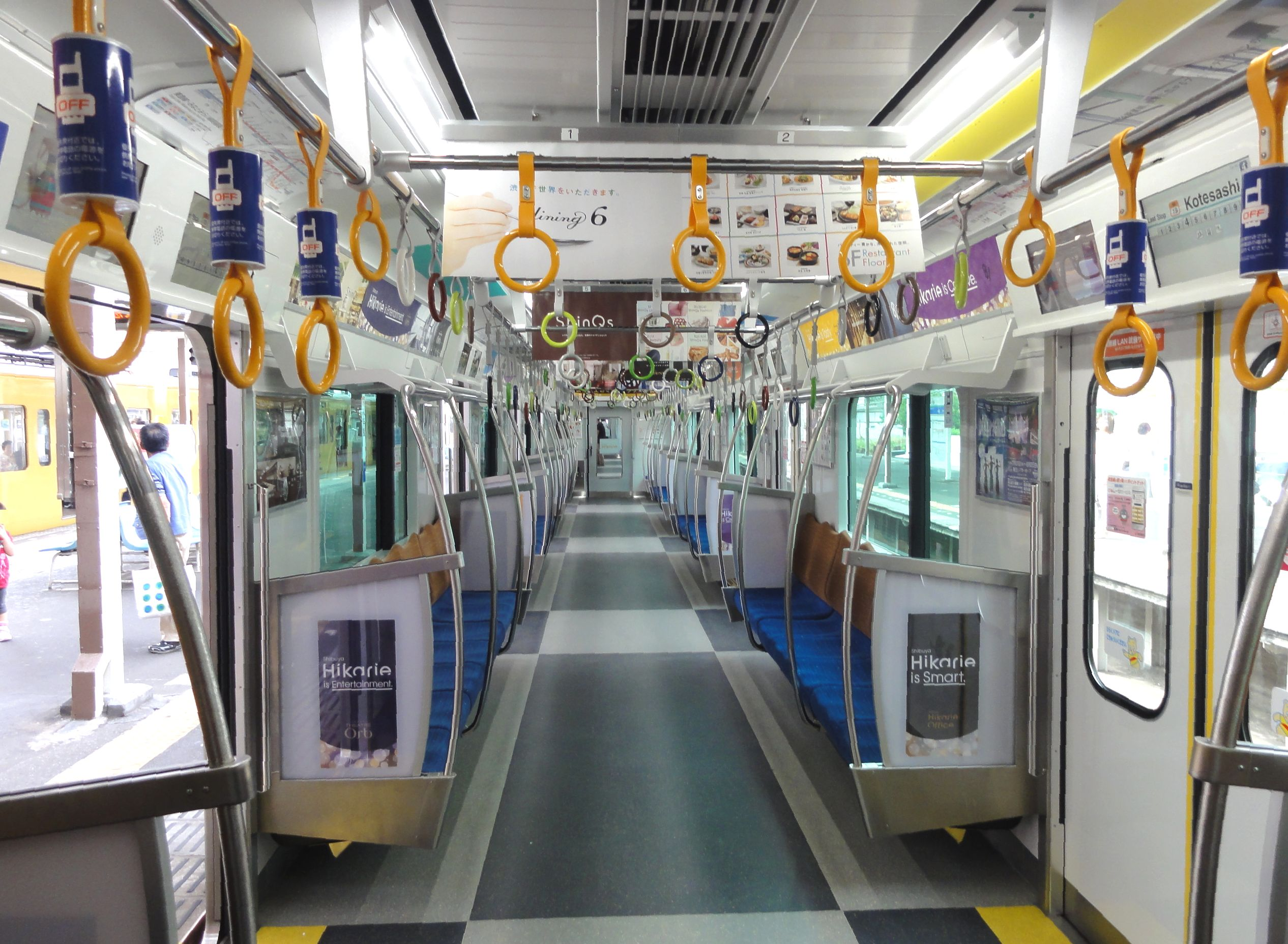
Interior of car 4410 (car 4)

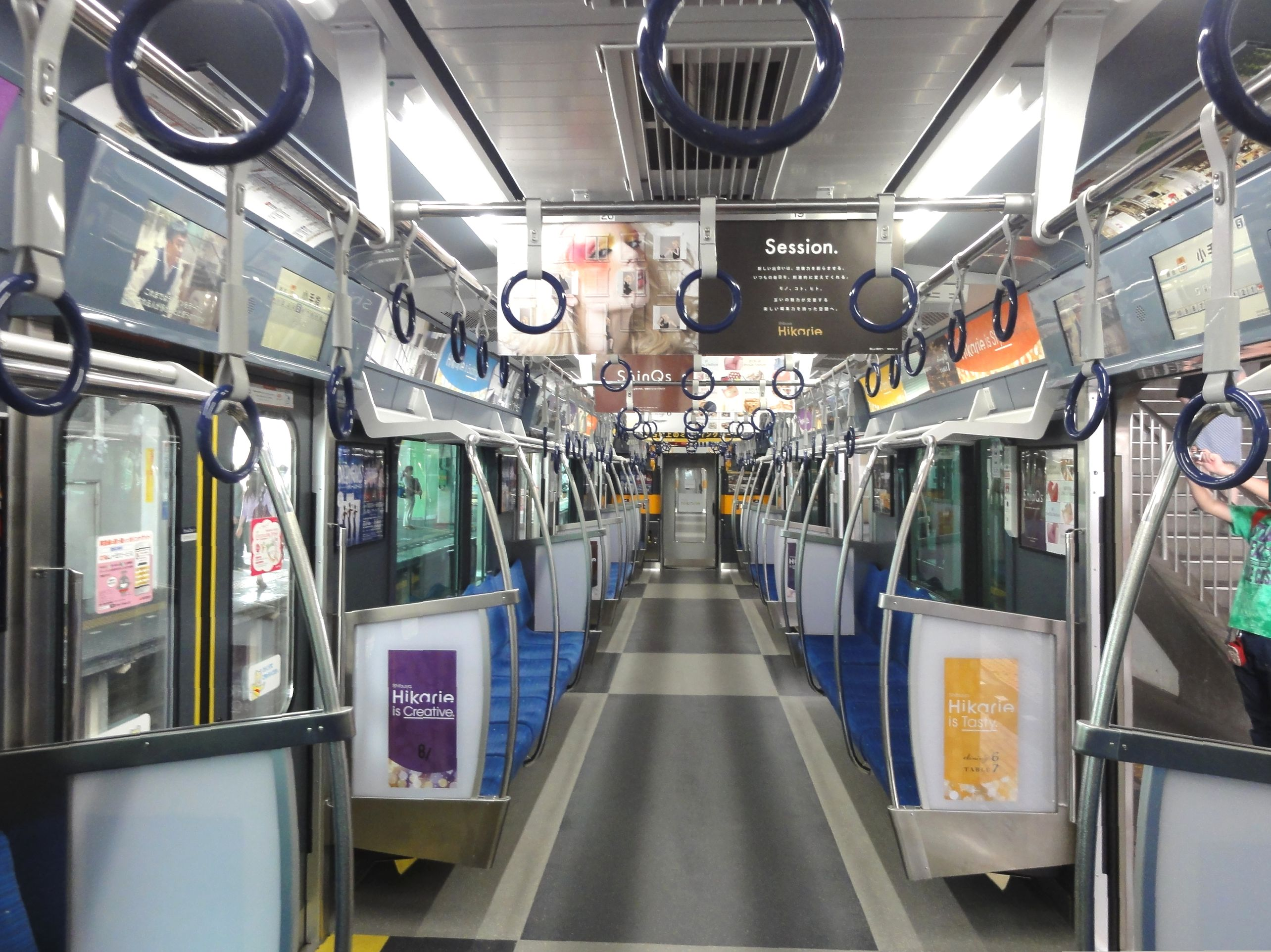
Interior of car 4510 (car 5)

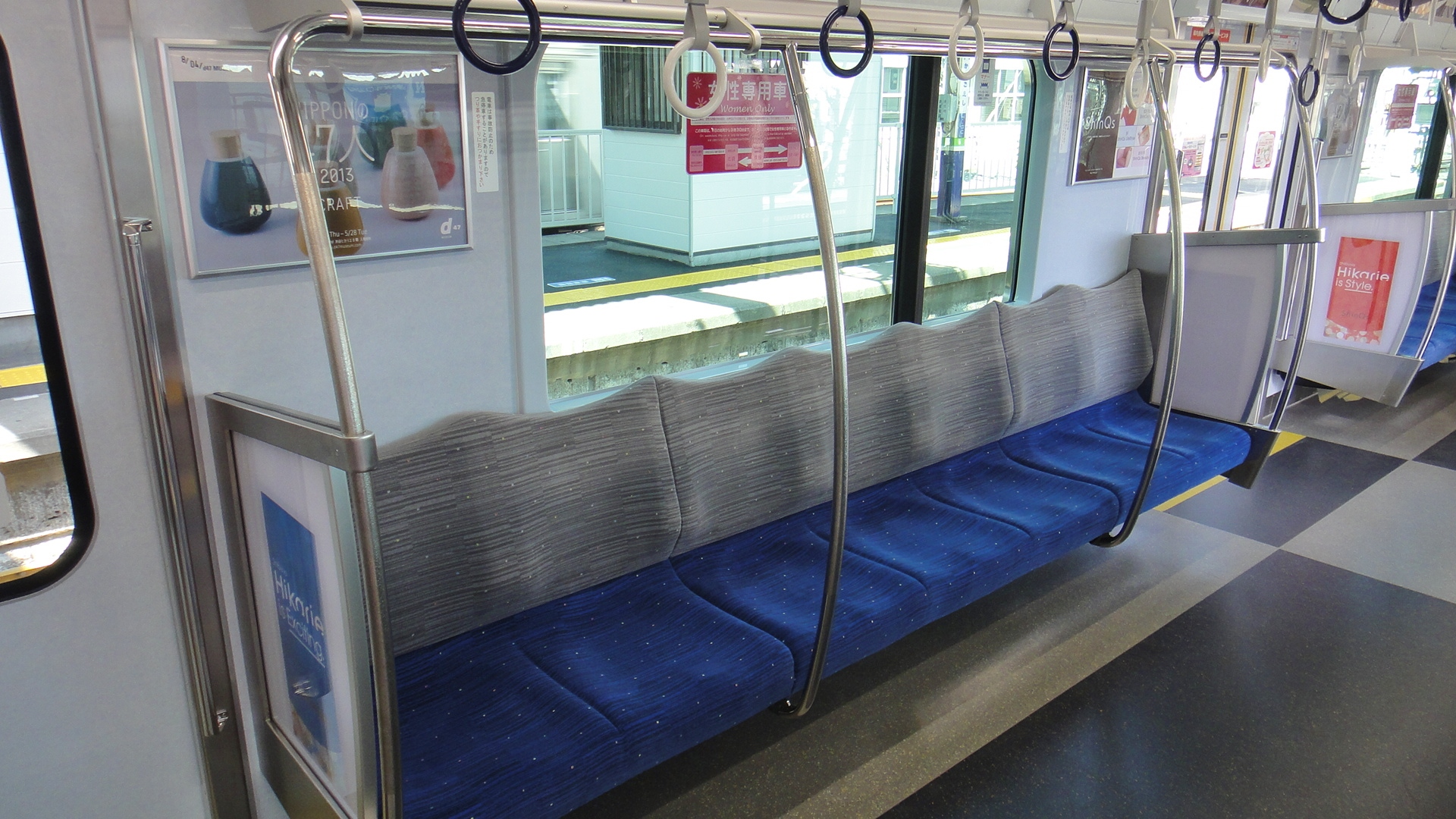
Seating in car 4110 with grey seat backs

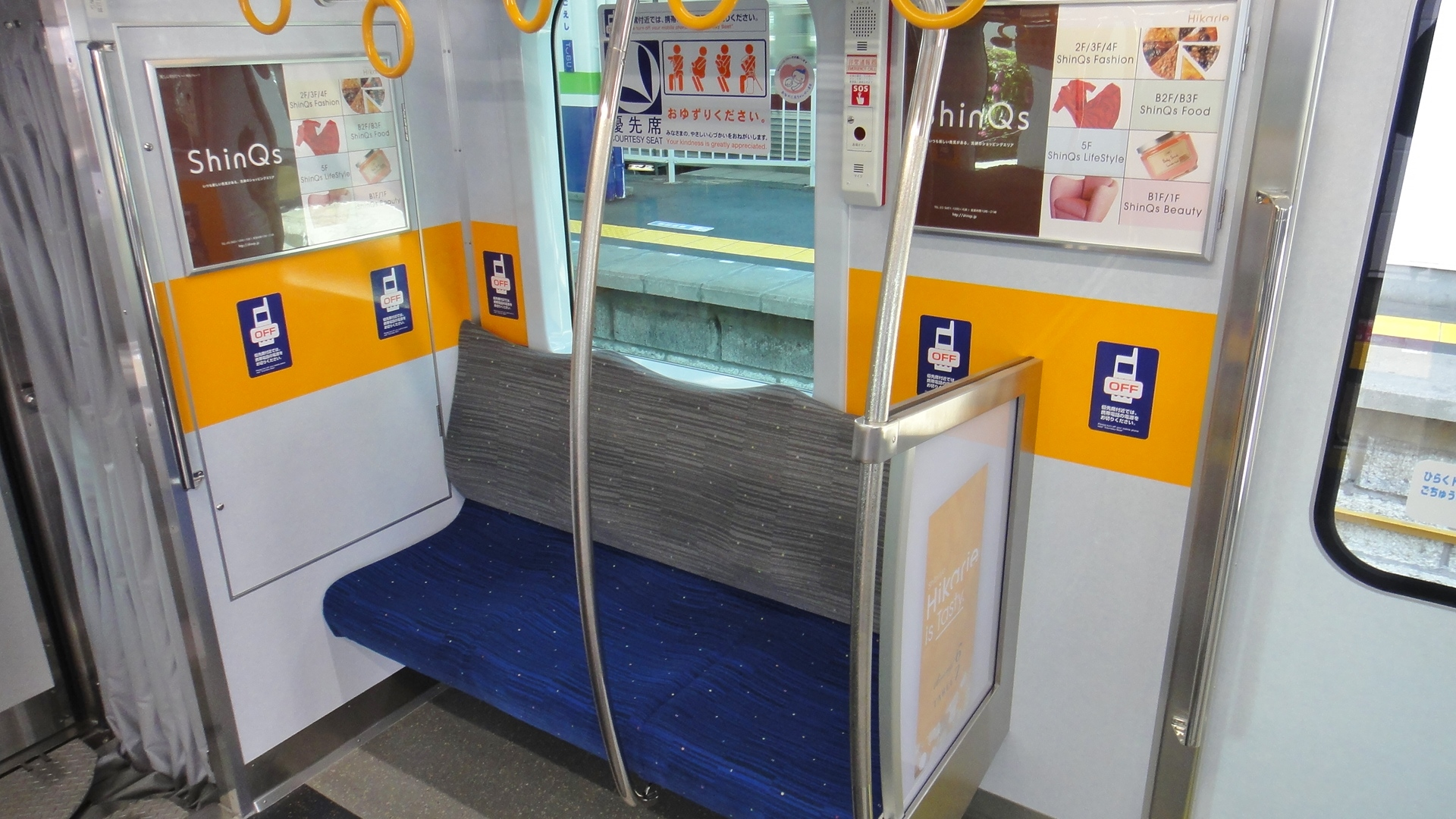
Priority seating in car 4110

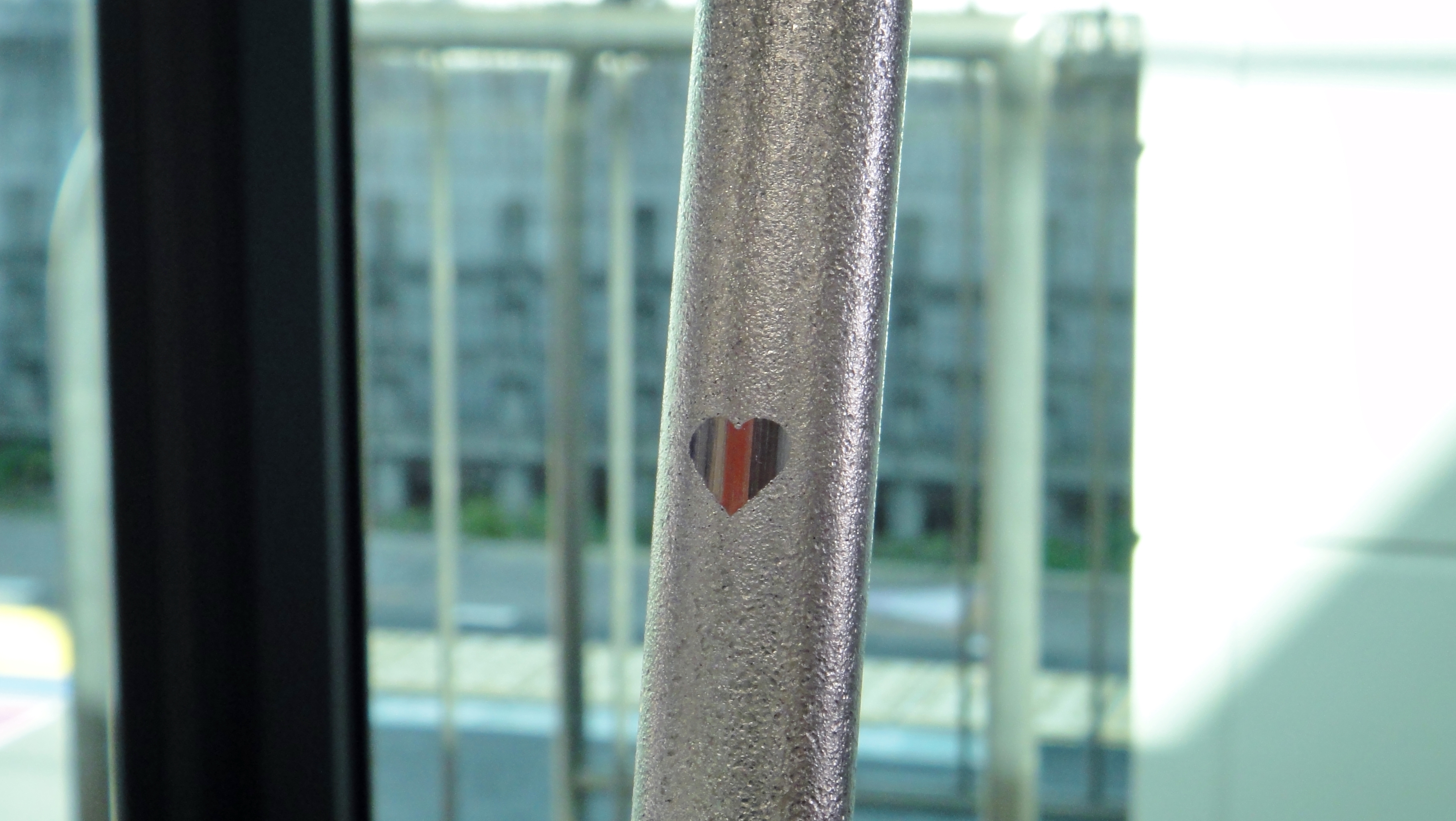
The embossed heart design on one of the trains stanchions

=== History ===
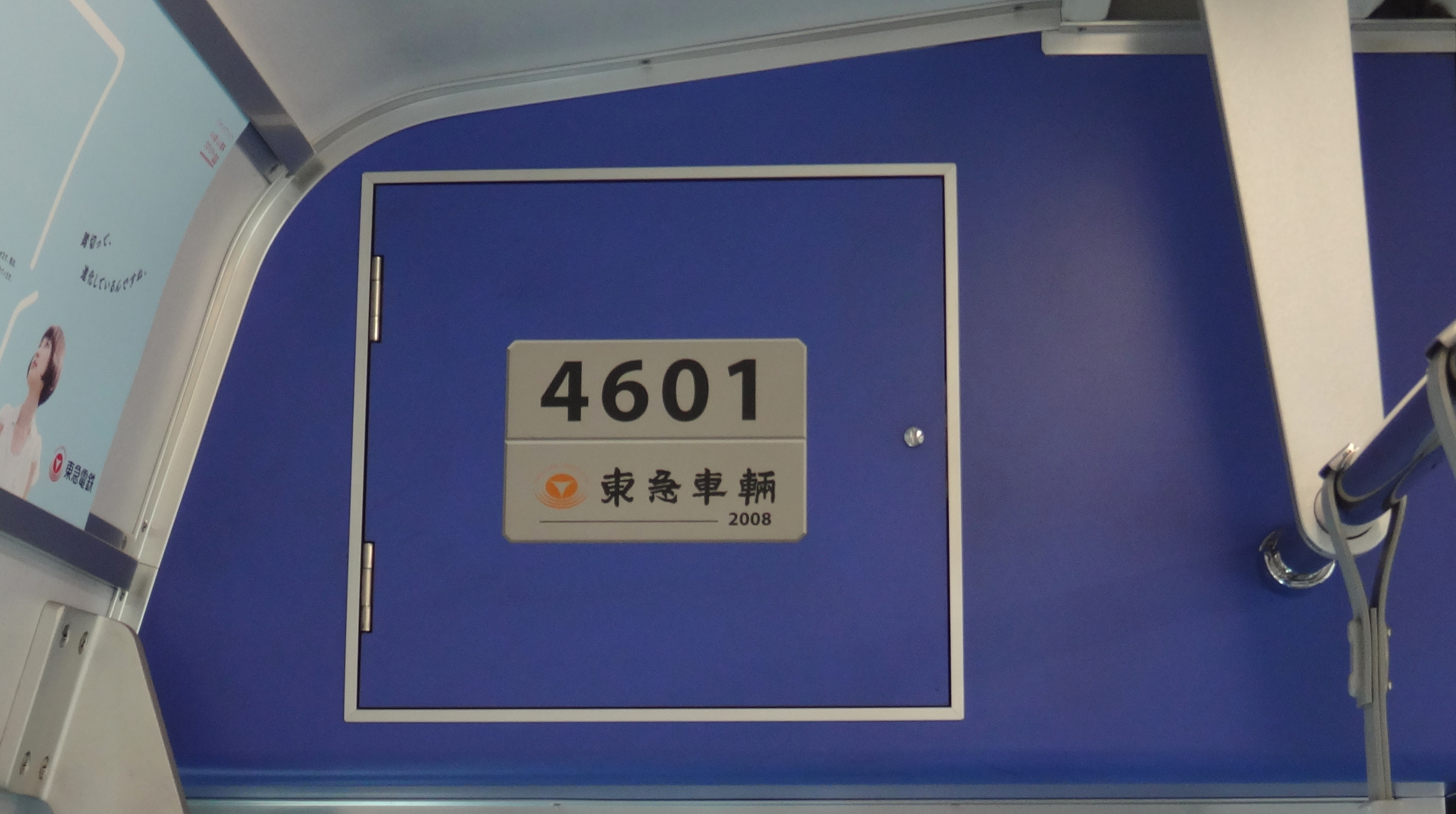
The builder's plate on car 4601 showing its original 2008 year of manufacture

Nine cars of the first set were delivered from Tokyu Car's Yokohama factory to Tokyu's Nagatsuta Depot in Kanagawa Prefecture between 29 and 31 March 2011. These cars were formed into a 10-car set with the inclusion of intermediate motor car 4601, renumbered from former 5050 series trailer car 5469, which was itself previously renumbered from motor car 5918. The second 10-car set was delivered from Tokyu Car in June 2011.

Set 4101 entered revenue service on the Tokyu Toyoko Line from 9 September 2011, reduced to an 8-car formation.

From 10 September 2012, 10-car 5050-4000 series sets entered revenue service on the Seibu Ikebukuro Line (and Seibu Yurakucho Line) and Tobu Tojo Line, with inter-running through to the Tokyo Metro Fukutoshin Line and Tokyo Metro Yurakucho Line.

In July 2020, a former 8-car set built in 2010 (set 5173) was joined with two new cars (built in 2019) and reformed as 10-car set 4111.

In July 2022, another former 8-car set 5166 was reformed into 10-car set 4112 with two new “Q Seat” cars in preparation for reserved seating services on the Toyoko Line in 2023. As of 1 August 2022, the new Q Seat cars feature a livery very similar to those used on the Oimachi Line, however they are painted in red in contrast to orange. Two months later, three more sets (5167–5169) were announced to be lengthened into 10-car trainsets in preparation for through-running service on the Sotetsu line. Once completed, they will be renumbered to sets 4113–4115 respectively. The first "Q Seat" cars entered service on the Toyoko Line on 24 October 2022; however "Q Seat" services only began on 10 August 2023.

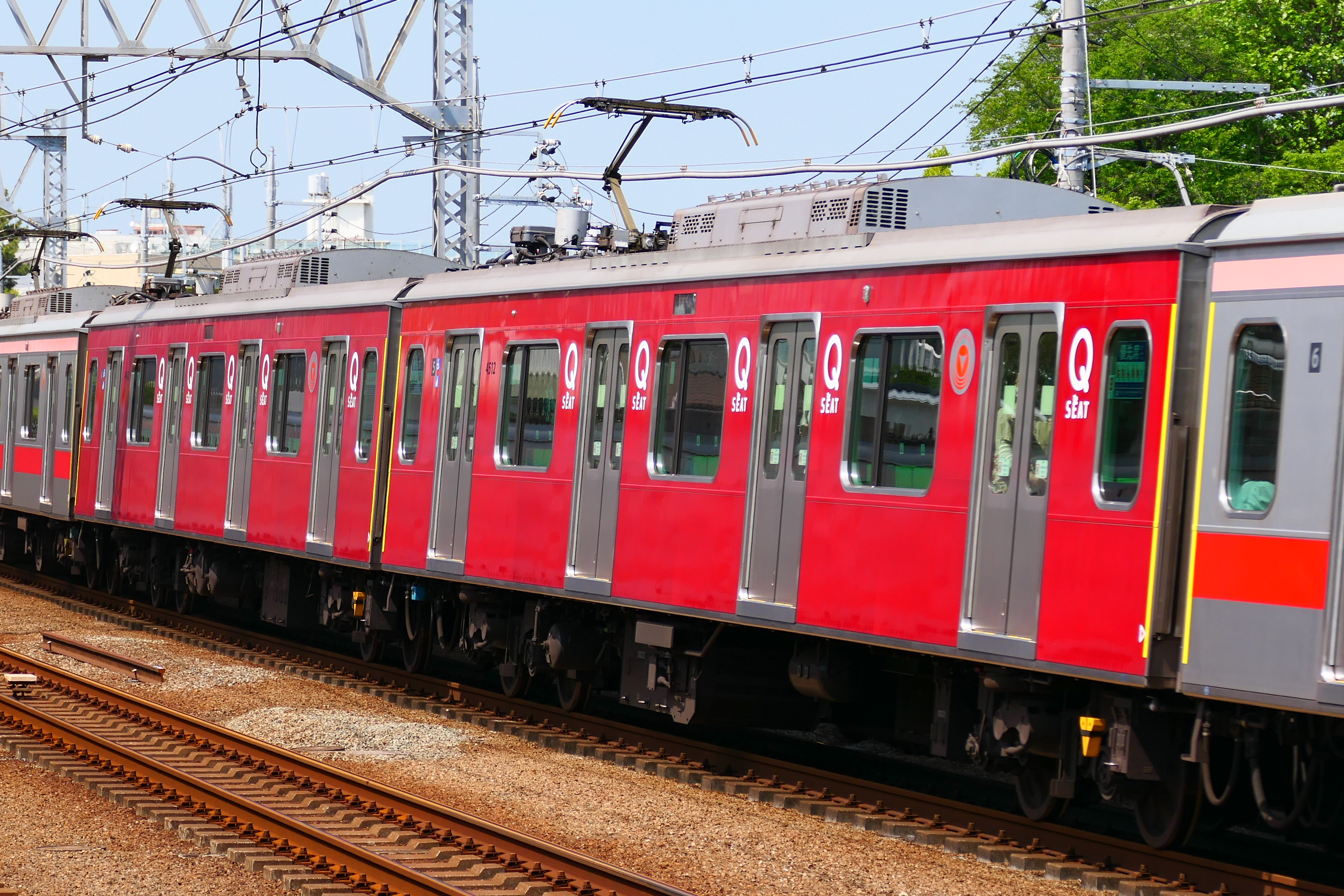
"Q Seat" cars on the Toyoko Line in April 2023

=== Livery variations ===
==== Tōkaidō–San'yō Shinkansen livery ====
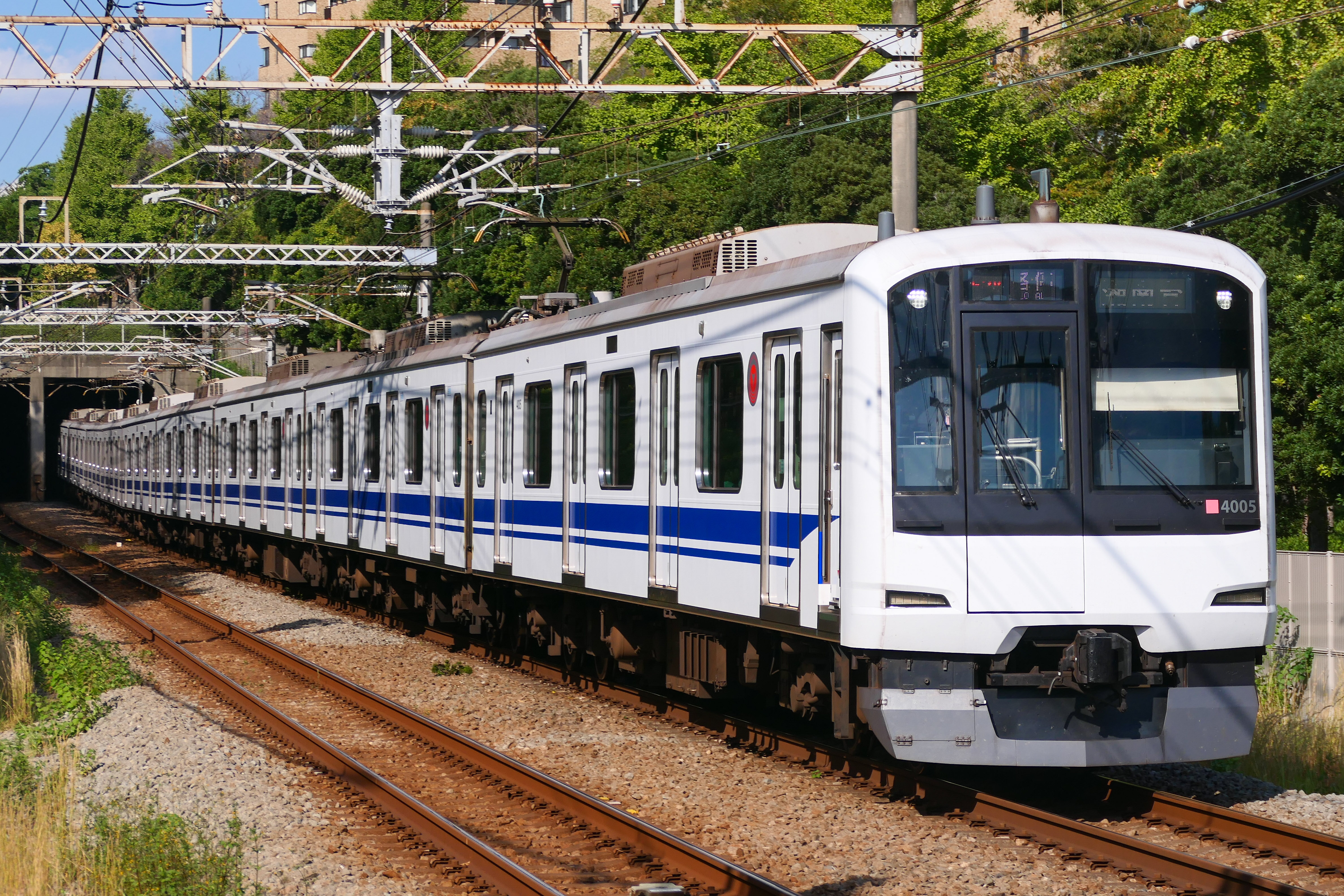
5050-4000 series set 4105 in Tōkaidō / Sanyō Shinkansen livery in October 2024

On 8 May 2024, Tokyu announced that as part of the "enjoy! West" promotion with the cooperation of JR Central, one 5050-4000 series set would receive a special wrapping livery based on the livery used by N700A series trains operated on the Tōkaidō and San'yō Shinkansen lines with the exterior painted white and two blue stripes added beneath the windows. On 14 May 2024, set 4105 returned to service with this livery.

== 5080 series ==
5080 series
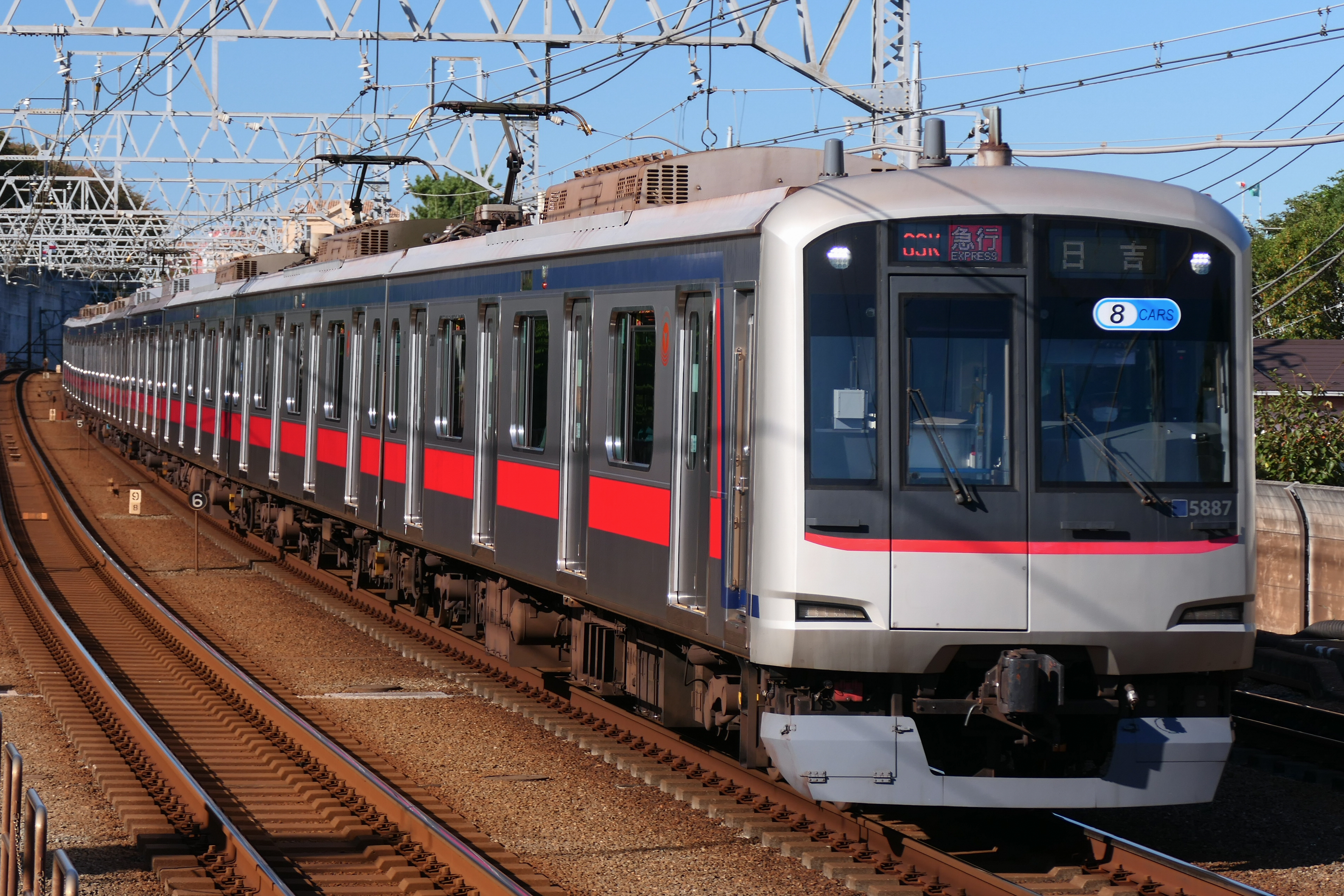
- Set 5187 on the Tokyu Meguro Line approaching Tamagawa in 2022
- Manufacturers: Tokyu Car Corporation; J-TREC (set lengthening cars)
- Built at: Yokohama
- Constructed: 2003–2008; 2021–2022 (set lengthening cars)
- Entered service: March 2003
- Number built: 80 vehicles (as of 4 September 2022)
- Number in service: 80 vehicles (10 sets)
- Formation: 8 cars per set Originally: 6 cars per set
- Fleet numbers: 5181–5190
- Operator: Tokyu Corporation
- Depot: Motosumiyoshi
- Lines served: Tokyu Meguro Line; Tokyo Metro Namboku Line; Saitama Rapid Railway Line; Toei Mita Line; Tokyu Shin-Yokohama Line; Sotetsu Shin-Yokohama Line; Sotetsu Main Line; Sotetsu Izumino Line

Specifications
- Car body construction: Stainless steel
- Car length: 20,200 mm (66 ft 3 in) (end cars); 20,000 mm (65 ft 7 in) (intermediate cars)
- Width: Body width: 2,778 mm (9 ft 1.4 in); Total width: 2,800 mm (9 ft 2 in)
- Height: 4,050 mm (13 ft 3 in)
- Doors: 4 pairs per side
- Maximum speed: 90 km/h (56 mph)
- Acceleration: 3.3 km/(h⋅s) (2.1 mph/s)
- Deceleration: 3.5 km/(h⋅s) (2.2 mph/s) (service); 4.5 km/(h⋅s) (2.8 mph/s) (emergency)
- Electric system: 1,500 V DC Overhead line
- Current collection: Pantograph
- Bogies: TS-1019A (motored); TS-1020A (trailer)
- Track gauge: 1,067 mm (3 ft 6 in)

Ten six-car sets were introduced on the Meguro Line from March 2003. These sets are distinguished from the others by a dark blue stripe above the doors. Unlike the other variants, they are powered by Toshiba equipment, rather than Hitachi. The 5080 series is fitted with CS-ATC, ATO and TASC for use on the Tokyo Metro Namboku Line, Saitama Rapid Railway Line, and Toei Mita Line. These sets are based at Motosumiyoshi Depot.

Two additional cars are expected to be inserted into each set for the introduction of through services to the Sōtetsu Shin-Yokohama Line. The first ten of these new cars, of which two are former 6000 series cars, were delivered in October 2021. As of October 2022, all sets have been lengthened to eight cars.

=== Operations ===
- ■ Tokyu Meguro Line
- ■ Tokyo Metro Namboku Line
- ■ Saitama Rapid Railway Line
- ■ Toei Mita Line
- ■ Tokyu Shin-Yokohama Line (since 18 March 2023)
- ■ Sotetsu Shin-Yokohama Line (since 18 March 2023)
- ■ Sotetsu Main Line (since 18 March 2023)
- ■ Sotetsu Izumino Line (since 18 March 2023)

=== Formation ===
Meguro Line eight-car sets feature “8 Cars” stickers on cars 1 and 8 to distinguish them from the original six car trainsets. They are formed as follows, with four motored (M) cars and four trailer (T) cars. Car 1 is at the Meguro end.

Car No.	1	2	3	4	5	6	7	8
Designation	Tc2	M	T	M	T	M2	M1	Tc1
Numbering	5180	5280	5380	5480	5580	5680	5780	5880
Weight (t)	26.3	30.9	28.2	30.9	28.2	33.3	32.9	26.4

The M1 cars (7) are fitted with two single-arm pantographs, and the M cars (2) and (4) are fitted with one.

==== Original 6-car set formation ====
Meguro Line six-car sets were originally formed as follows, with three motored (M) cars and three trailer (T) cars. Car 1 was at the Meguro end.

Car No.	1	2	3	4	5	6
Designation	Tc2	M	T	M2	M1	Tc1
Numbering	5180	5280	5380	5480	5580	5680
Weight (t)	26.3	30.9	28.2	33.3	32.9	26.4
Capacity (total/seated)	141/48	152/51	151/54		152/51	141/48

The M1 cars (5) was fitted with two single-arm pantographs, and the M cars (2) were fitted with one.

=== Interior ===
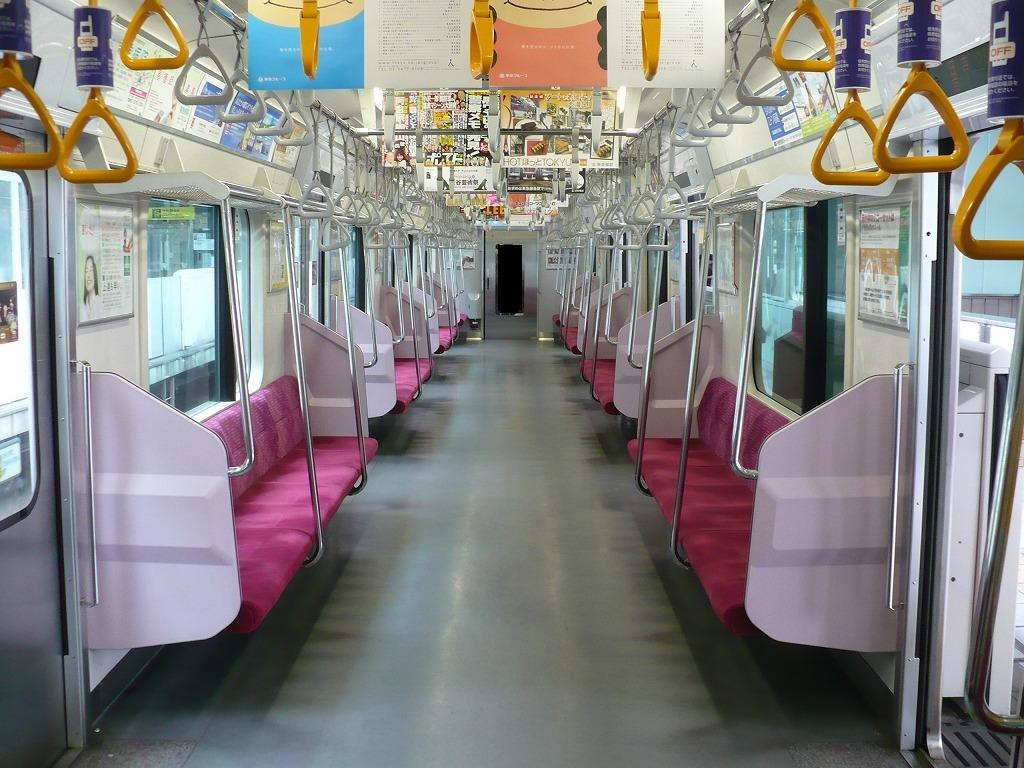
5080 series interior

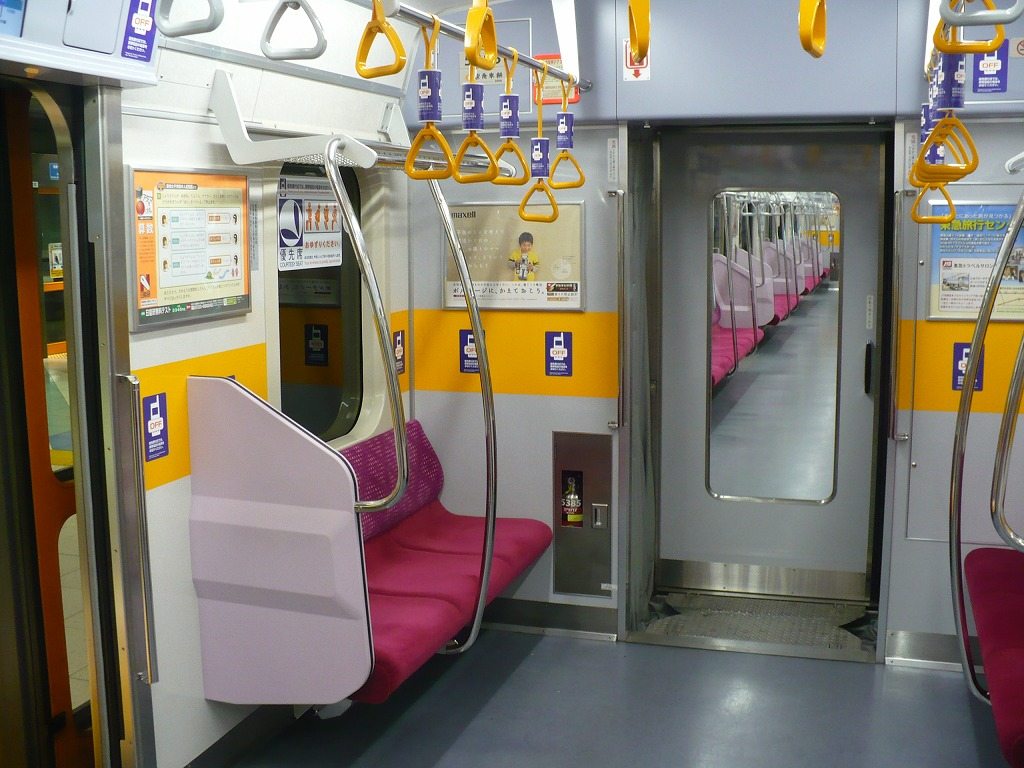
Priority seating

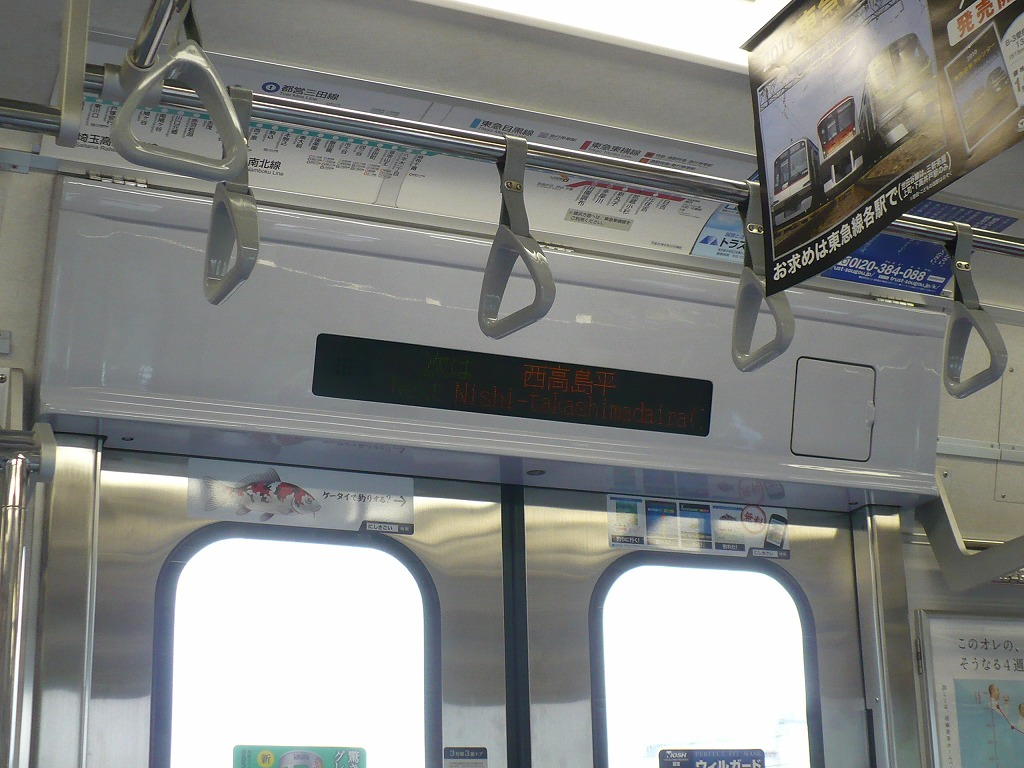
LED passenger information display in car 5181

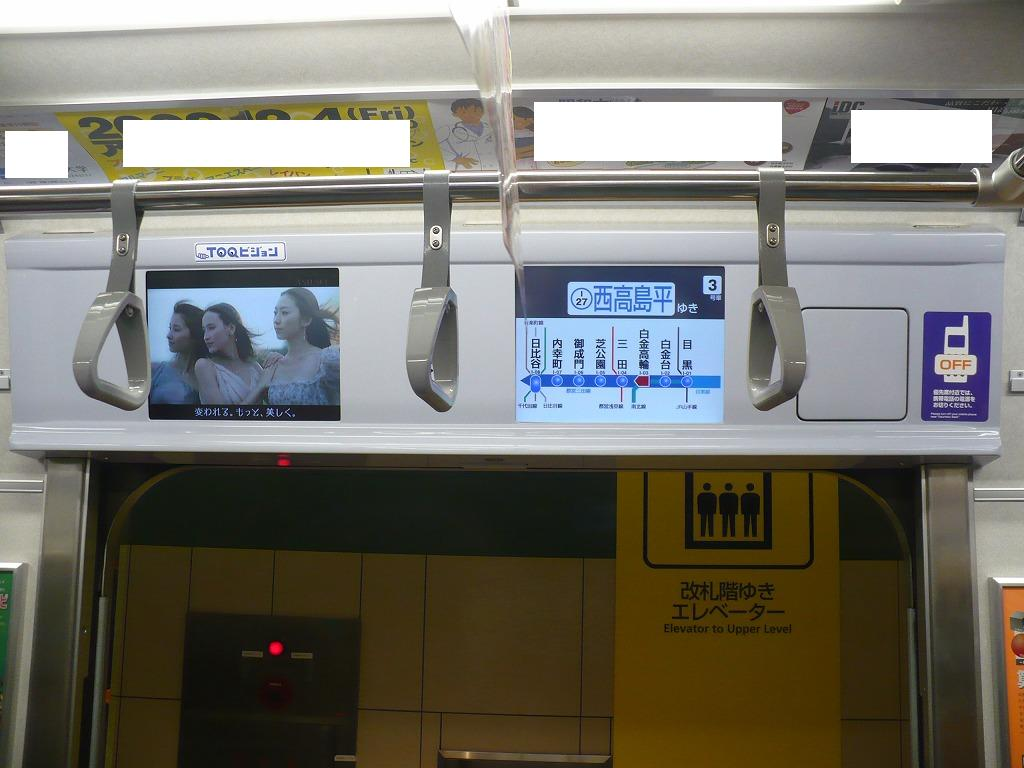
LCD passenger information display in car 5185

== Y500 series ==
Y500 series
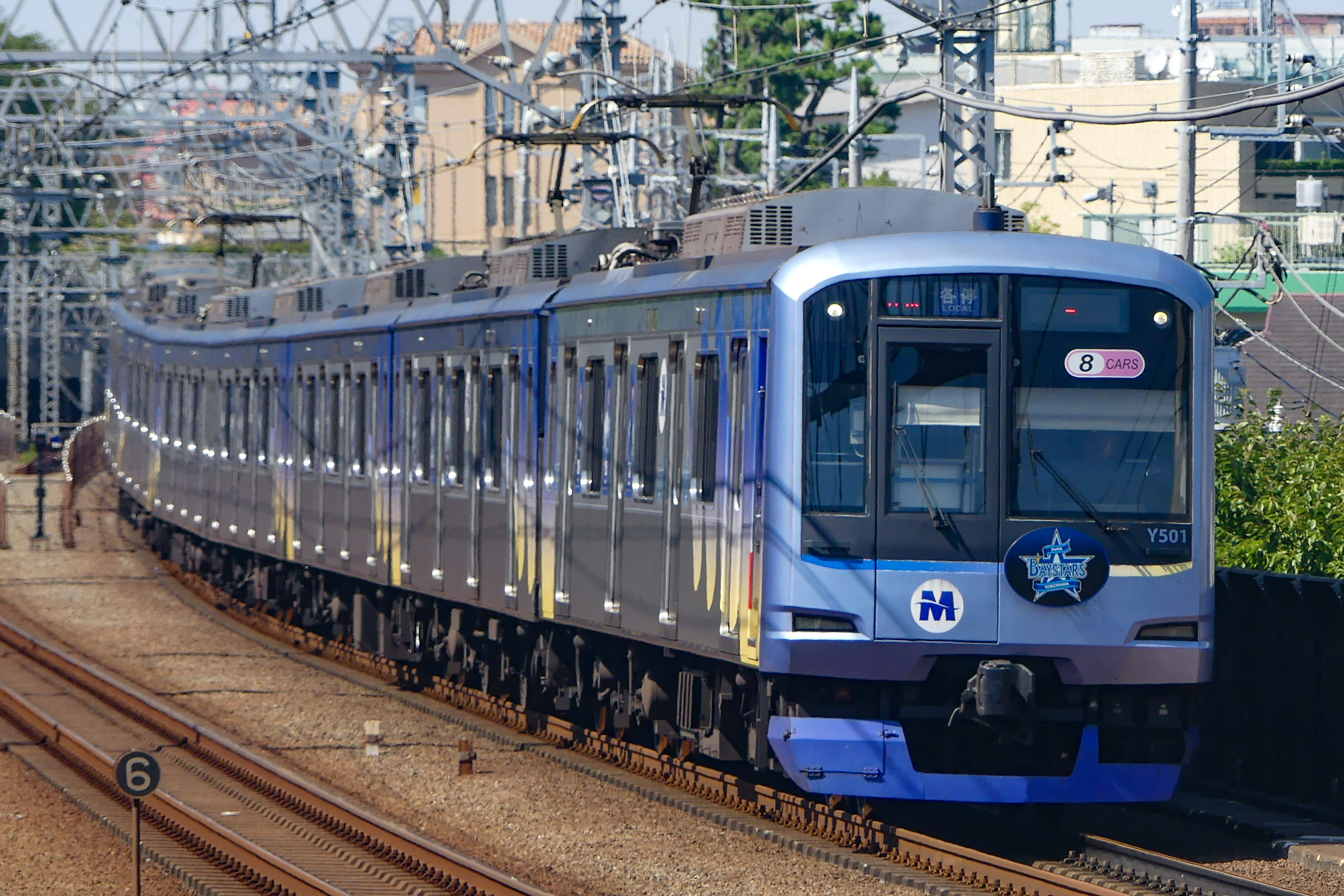
- A Yokohama Minatomirai Railway Y500 series on the Tokyu Toyoko Line in August 2018
- Manufacturer: Tokyu Car Corporation
- Built at: Yokohama
- Replaced: Tokyu 9000 series
- Constructed: 2004–
- Entered service: February 2004
- Number built: 56 vehicles (7 sets)
- Number in service: 48 vehicles (6 sets)
- Number scrapped: 8 vehicles (1 set) (accident damage)
- Formation: 8 cars per set
- Fleet numbers: Y511–Y517
- Operator: Yokohama Minatomirai Railway
- Lines served: Minatomirai Line; Tokyu Toyoko Line; Tokyo Metro Fukutoshin Line; Seibu Yurakucho Line; Seibu Ikebukuro Line; Tobu Tojo Line

Specifications
- Car body construction: Stainless steel
- Car length: 20,200 mm (66 ft 3 in) (end cars); 20,000 mm (65 ft 7 in) (intermediate cars)
- Width: Body width: 2,778 mm (9 ft 1.4 in) (Note: Set Y517 is 20 mm (0.79 in) wider); Total width: 2,800 mm (9 ft 2 in)
- Height: 4,050 mm (13 ft 3 in)
- Doors: 4 pairs per side
- Maximum speed: 110 km/h (68 mph)
- Electric system: 1,500 V DC Overhead line
- Current collection: Pantograph
- Track gauge: 1,067 mm (3 ft 6 in)

These eight-car sets are owned by the Yokohama Minatomirai Railway and are used for interrunning services over the Tokyu Toyoko Line and Minatomirai Line. The fleet of six eight-car sets entered service in February 2004.

Set Y516 was withdrawn in 2017 following accident damaged sustained in 2014, and a replacement set (Y517, former Tokyu 5050 series set 5156) was transferred to Yokohama Minatomirai Railway. Set Y517 entered service with the operator on 24 March 2018.

=== Operations ===
- ■ Minatomirai Line
- ■ Tokyu Toyoko Line
- ■ Tokyo Metro Fukutoshin Line (since 16 March 2013)
- ■ Seibu Yurakucho Line (since 16 March 2013)
- ■ Seibu Ikebukuro Line (since 16 March 2013)
- ■ Tobu Tojo Line (since 16 March 2013)

=== Formation ===
Yokohama Minatomirai Railway Y500 series sets are formed as follows.

Car No.	1	2	3	4	5	6	7	8
Designation	Tc2	M2'	M1	T2	T1	M2	M1'	Tc1
Numbering	Y510	Y540	Y550	Y560	Y570	Y580	Y590	Y500

The M1 cars (3 and 7) are each fitted with two single-arm pantographs.

=== Interior ===
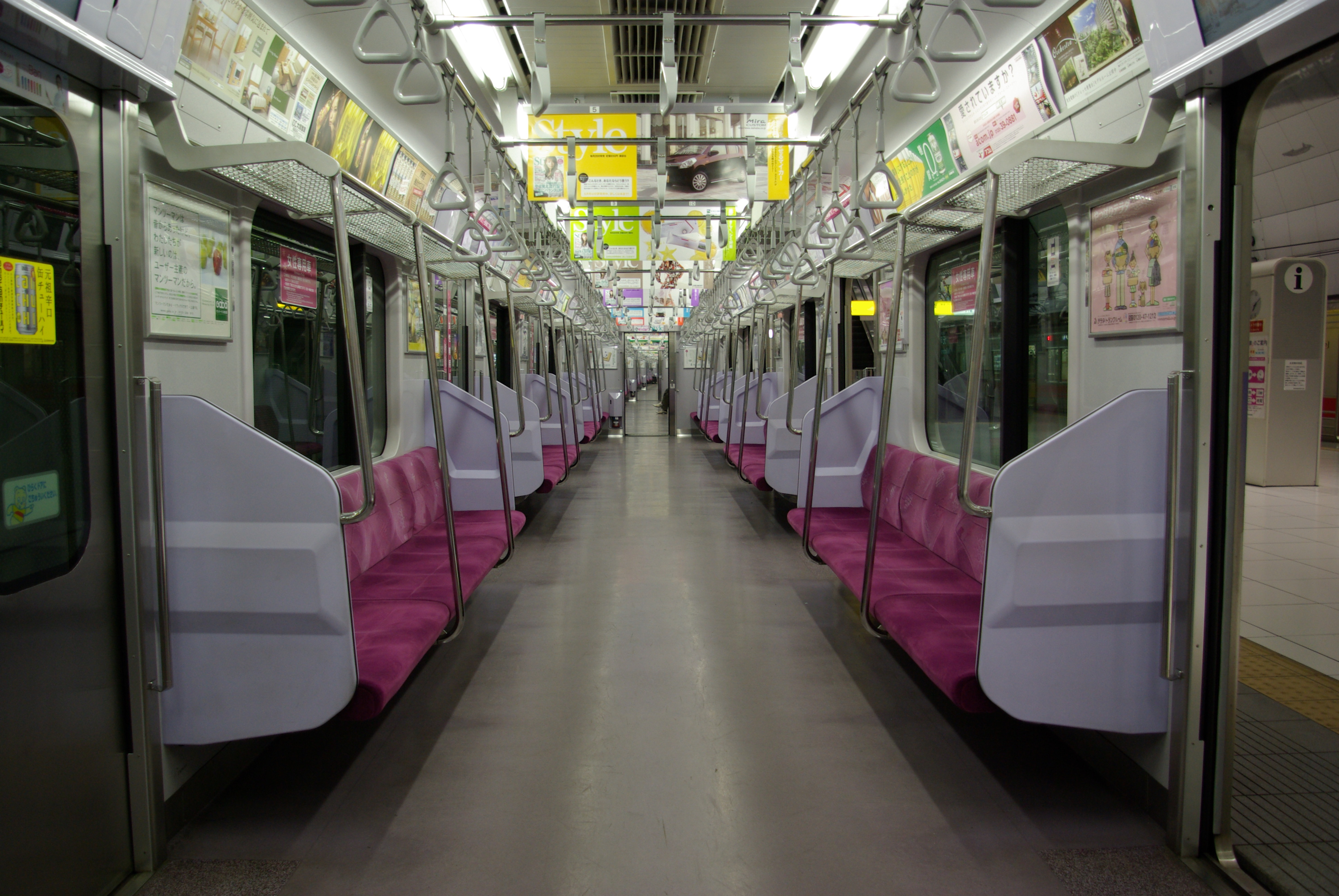
Y500 series interior

== Accidents ==
On the evening of 5 October 2025, the rear car of 5000 series set 5101 collided with an oncoming Shibuya-bound train—Tokyu 2020 series set 2035—as it was entering a layover track near Kajigaya Station on the Tokyu Den-en-toshi Line, causing car 5101 to derail. No injuries were reported, but the accident resulted in a suspension of train service between Shibuya and Kajigaya until around midnight on 7 October. One year later, on 13 October 2026, car 5101 was transported from Nagatsuta depot for scrapping.
