= Jiyūgaoka =

Neighborhood in Meguro, Tokyo, Japan

Coordinates: 35°36′27″N 139°40′07″E

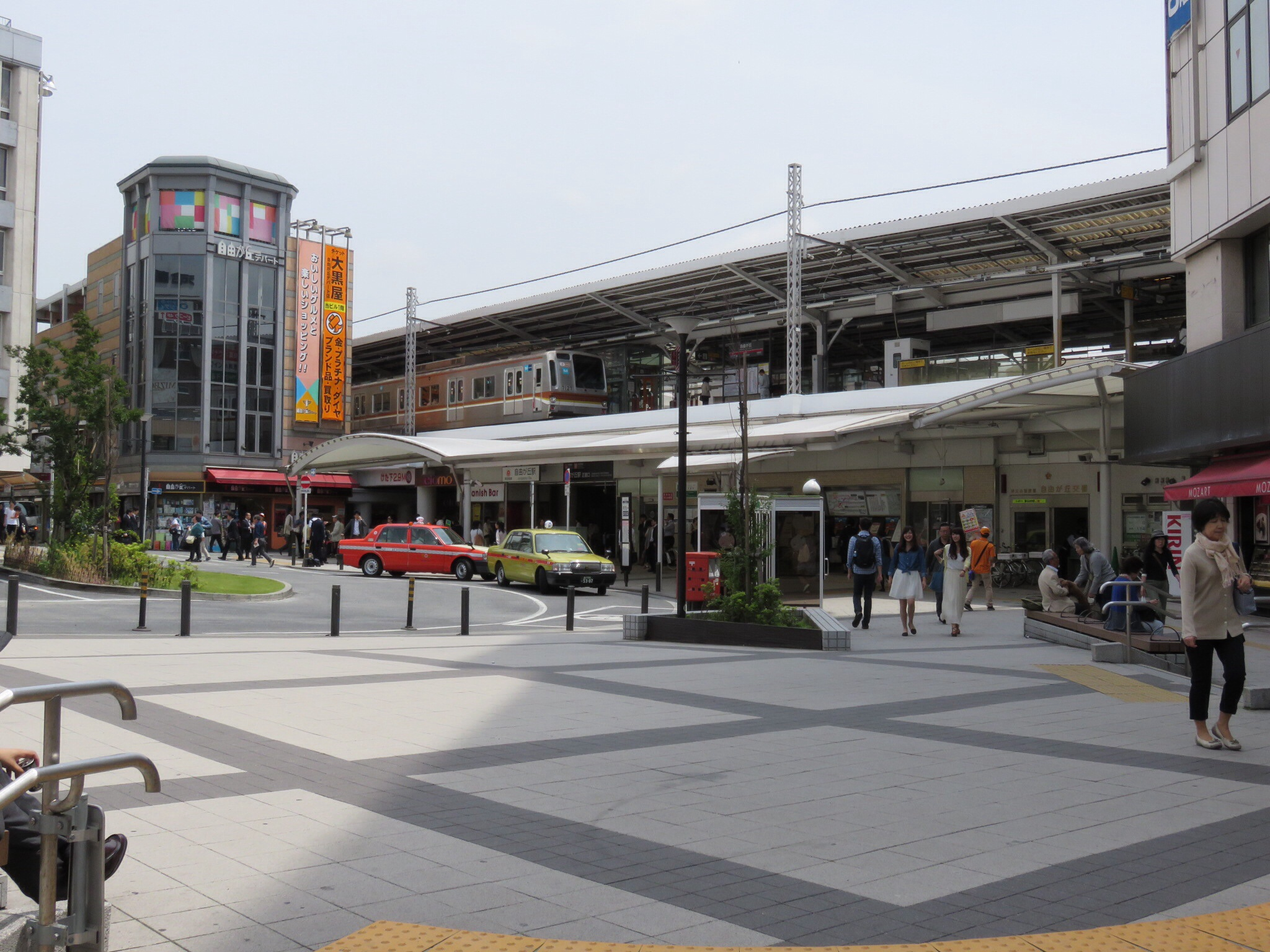
Jiyūgaoka Station (Tokyo)

Jiyūgaoka (自由が丘, Jiyūgaoka) 'Liberty Hill' is a neighborhood in southern Meguro, Tokyo, Japan. It consists of districts 1-chome to 3-chome, and had a population of 7,231 as of January 2013. The name also refers to the broader area surrounding Jiyūgaoka Station, which includes both Jiyūgaoka, part of Midorigaoka and nearby Okusawa (奥沢) in Setagaya.

Jiyūgaoka Station is located at the junction of the Tōyoko Line and Ōimachi Line. There are numerous apparel stores, zakka stores, cafes and restaurants. Jiyūgaoka is often considered one of the most desirable places to live in Tokyo. The middle class demographic is also reflected in the concentration of private schools in the neighbourhood and the large number of after school juku. Jiyūgaoka has had its own newspaper since 1919.

== History ==
Jiyūgaoka was largely rural until the late 1920s, when rail service commenced. On 28 August 1927, Kuhonbutsu-mae Station (九品仏前駅, Kuhonbutsu-mae eki) was established on the Tōyoko Line. In the same year, Jiyūgaoka-gakuen High School was opened. The school name, 自由ヶ丘学園高等学校, literally "Liberal Hill Academy", due to its liberal education (part of the Taishō period liberal education movement; see 大正自由教育運動), later gave rise to the name of the nearby station and thence the entire area, similarly to the neighboring stations of Toritsu-daigaku Station and Gakugei-daigaku Station (named for universities formerly located in the area).

In 1929, the Ōimachi Line was opened and a new Kuhonbutsu Station (九品仏駅, Kuhonbutsu eki) was established about 800m west of the already existing Kuhonbutsu-mae Station. Kuhonbutsu-mae Station was renamed to Jiyūgaoka Station around the same time. The "Jiyūgaoka" name was formally adopted for addresses in the area in 1932.

Following World War II, the area grew quickly as a suburb of Tokyo, with its central business district taking its current form around the 1970s. The spelling of the area was changed from the original 自由ヶ丘 to the current 自由が丘 (replacing the small ke) in 1965, with the station following in 1966.

== Population ==
As of January 2013:

Area	Population
1-chome	2,533
2-chome	2,613
3-chome	2,085
Total	7,231

== Transportation ==
=== Road ===
- Jiyu Dori
- Meguro Dori
- Marie Claire Dori
- Midorisho Dori
- Gakuen Dori
- Suzukake Dori
- Shirakaba Dori
- Maple Dori
- Cattleya Dori
- Megami Dori

=== Rail ===
- Tōkyū Tōyoko Line
- Tōkyū Ōimachi Line

=== Bus ===
- Tokyu Coach – Jiyūgaoka Station
- Tokyu Bus – Jiyūgaoka Station Entrance

There is also a community bus, called "Thanks Nature Bus", which runs on tempura oil . The fuel for this bus, called VDF (vegetable diesel fuel), is an alternative fuel which is said to be "clean and environmentally friendly" purified and recycled oil, but there is still room for improvement.

== Education ==
Meguro City Board of Education operates public elementary and junior high schools.

Parts of each of the three chome are zoned to Miyamae Elementary School (宮前小学校) and No. 10 Junior High School (第十中学校), while other parts of those chome are zoned to Midorigaoka Elementary School (緑ヶ丘小学校) and No. 11 Junior High School (第十一中学校).

== Events ==
- January: Gantan-sai (New Year Festival) ― boasting a history of more than 800 years at Kumano Shrine. Meguro City intangible cultural heritage.
- April: Jiyugaoka Cherry Blossom Festival ― first Friday of April each year. Music and festivities under cherry blossoms in full bloom along Green Street.
- April/May: Spring Festival ― centered just outside the Jiyugaoka Station main entrance featuring well-known guest artists.
- May: Marie Claire Festival ― centered along Marie Claire Street next to Jiyugaoka Station south exit. Concert featuring chanson artists and other music.
- July: Bon Odori festival
