= Myōrenji Station =

Railway station in Yokohama, Japan

Myōrenji Station 妙蓮寺駅

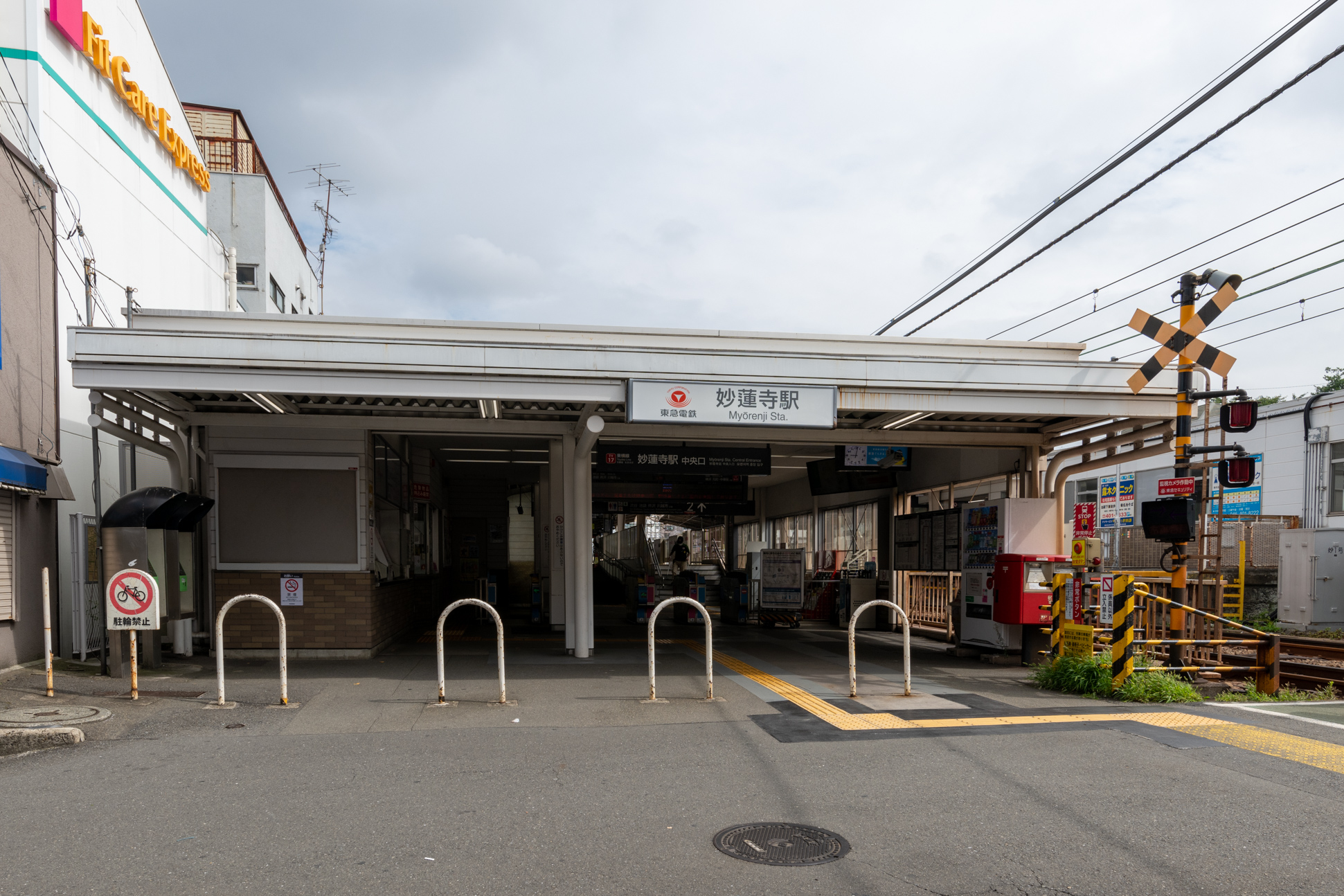
- The central entrance of Myōrenji Station in August 2022

General information
- Location: 1-1-1 Kikuna, Kōhoku Ward, Yokohama City; Kanagawa Prefecture 222-0011; Japan
- Coordinates: 35.498474°N 139.633138°E
- Operator: Tōkyū Railways
- Line: Tōyoko Line
- Distance: 20.2 km (12.6 mi) from Shibuya
- Platforms: 2 side platforms
- Tracks: 2

Construction
- Structure type: At grade

Other information
- Station code: TY17
- Website: Official website

History
- Opened: 14 February 1926; 100 years ago
- Former names: Myōrenji-mae (until 1931)

Passengers
- FY 2019: 26,102 daily

Services
Preceding station	Tōkyū Railways	Following station
Hakuraku towards Yokohama	Tōyoko Line Local	Kikuna towards Shibuya
Location
- Location within Yokohama Location within Kanagawa Prefecture Location within Tokyo Bay and Bōsō Peninsula Location within Japan

Myōrenji Station (妙蓮寺駅, Myōrenji-eki) is a passenger railway station located in Kōhoku-ku, Yokohama, Kanagawa Prefecture, Japan, operated by the private railway company Tokyu Corporation. It is located in front of Myōrenji Buddhist temple after which it takes its name.

== Lines ==
Myōrenji Station is served by the Tōkyū Tōyoko Line from Shibuya in Tokyo to Yokohama in Kanagawa Prefecture. It is 20.2 kilometers from the terminus of the line at Shibuya.

== Station layout ==
The station consists of two elevated opposed side platforms, with the station building underneath.

=== Platforms ===
1	Tōkyū Tōyoko Line	for Yokohama; Minatomirai Line for Minatomirai and Motomachi-Chūkagai
2	Tōkyū Tōyoko Line	for Kikuna, Musashi-Kosugi, Jiyūgaoka, Naka-Meguro, and Shibuya; Tokyo Metro Fukutoshin Line for Shinjuku-sanchōme, Ikebukuro, Kotake-mukaihara, and Wakōshi; Seibu Ikebukuro Line for Hannō; Tōbu Tōjō Line for Shinrin-kōen

== History ==
The station opened on February 14, 1926, as Myōrenji-mae Station (妙蓮寺前駅). It was renamed Myōrenji on January 1, 1931.

== Passenger statistics ==
In fiscal 2019, the station was used by an average of 26,102 passengers daily.

The passenger figures for previous years are as shown below.

Fiscal year	daily average
2005	25,797
2010	24,538
2015	25,063

== Surrounding area ==
- Myoren-ji Temple
- Myorenji Station Shopping Street
- Yokohama Myorenji Post Office
- Yokohama City Kohoku Elementary School

== See also ==
- List of railway stations in Japan
