= Hakuraku Station =

Railway station in Yokohama, Japan

Hakuraku Station 白楽駅

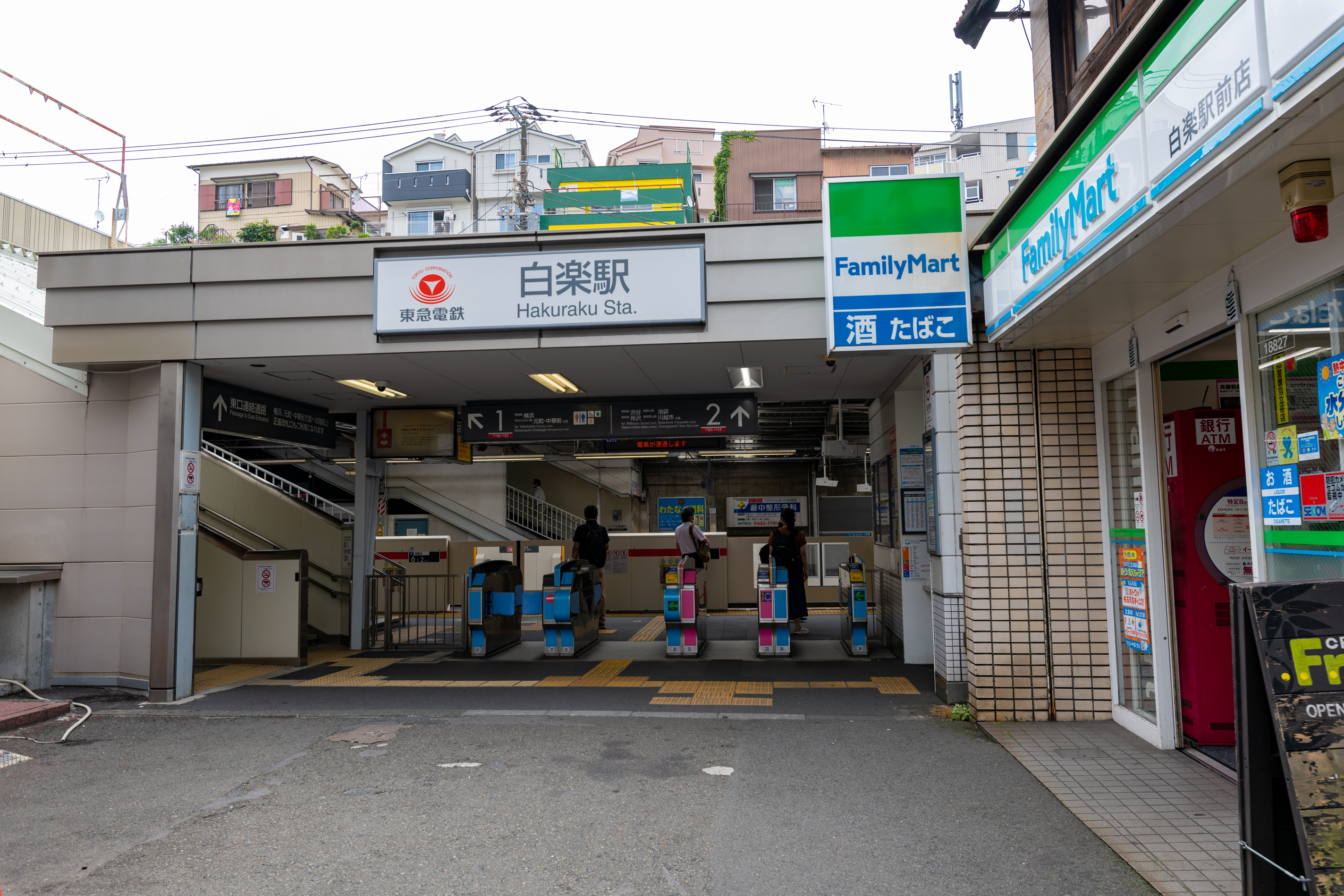
- West Exit

General information
- Location: Hakuraku 100, Kanagawa Ward, Yokohama City; Kanagawa Prefecture （横浜市神奈川区白楽100） Japan
- Coordinates: 35.489647°N 139.627894°E
- Operator: Tōkyū Railways
- Line: Tōyoko Line
- Distance: 21.4 km (13.3 mi) from Shibuya
- Platforms: 2 side platforms
- Tracks: 2

Construction
- Structure type: At grade

Other information
- Station code: TY18
- Website: Official website

History
- Opened: 14 February 1926; 100 years ago

Passengers
- 2019: 44,323 daily

Services
Preceding station	Tōkyū Railways	Following station
Higashi-hakuraku towards Yokohama	Tōyoko Line Local	Myōrenji towards Shibuya
Location
- Location within Yokohama Location within Kanagawa Prefecture Location within Tokyo Bay and Bōsō Peninsula Location within Japan

Hakuraku Station (白楽駅, Hakuraku-eki) is a passenger railway station located in Kanagawa-ku, Yokohama, Kanagawa Prefecture, Japan, operated by the private railway company Tokyu Corporation.

== Lines ==
Hakuraku Station is served by the Tōkyū Tōyoko Line from Shibuya in Tokyo to Yokohama in Kanagawa Prefecture. It is 21.4 kilometers from the terminus of the line at Shibuya.

== Station layout ==
The station consists of two elevated opposed side-platforms, with the station building underneath. These platforms can only accommodate eight-car train lengths.

=== Platforms ===
1	Tōkyū Tōyoko Line	for Yokohama; Minatomirai Line for Motomachi-Chūkagai
2	Tōkyū Tōyoko Line	for Musashi-Kosugi, Jiyūgaoka, Naka-Meguro, and Shibuya; Tokyo Metro Fukutoshin Line for Ikebukuro, Kotake-mukaihara, and Wakōshi; Seibu Ikebukuro Line for Hannō; Tōbu Tōjō Line for Shinrin-kōen

== History ==
Hakuraku Station was opened on February 14, 1926. The station building was remodeled in 2006.

== Passenger statistics ==
In fiscal 2019, the station was used by an average of 44,323 passengers daily.

The passenger figures for previous years are as shown below.

Fiscal year	daily average
2005	38,103
2010	42,055
2015	44,898

== Surrounding area ==
- Kanagawa University Yokohama Campus
- Hakuraku Shopping Street
- Rokukakubashi Shopping Street
- Kanagawa Prefectural Police Traffic Safety Center
- Seishin Girls' High School

== See also ==
- List of railway stations in Japan
