= Tammachi Station =

Railway station in Yokohama, Japan

Tammachi Station 反町駅

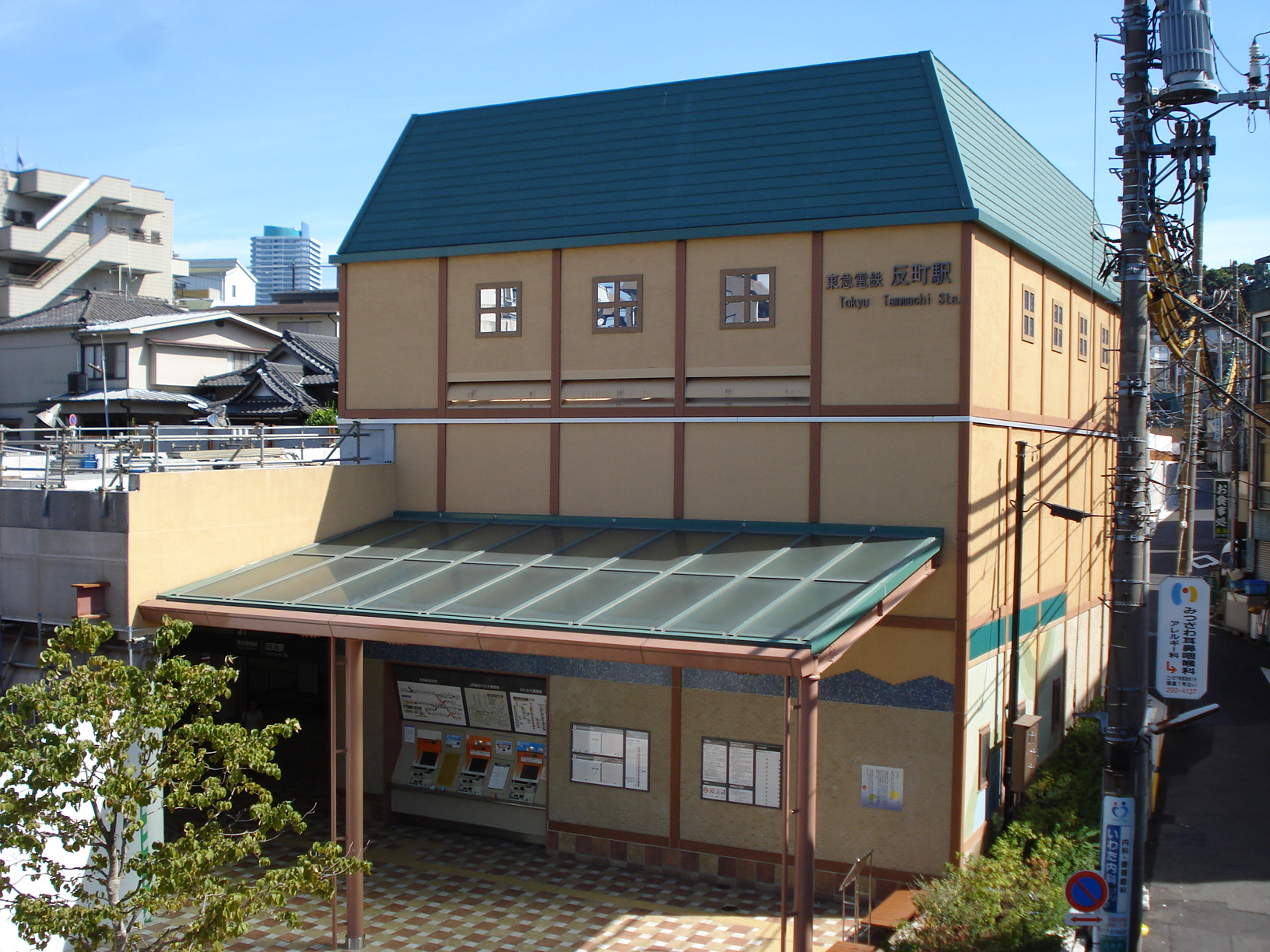
- Tammachi Station

General information
- Location: Kami-Tammachi 1-1, Kanagawa-ku, Yokohama-shi, Kanagawa-ken 221-0831; Japan
- Coordinates: 35.474113°N 139.625432°E
- Operator: Tōkyū Railways
- Line: Tōyoko Line
- Distance: 23.2 km (14.4 mi) from Shibuya
- Platforms: 1 island platform
- Tracks: 2

Construction
- Structure type: Underground

Other information
- Station code: TY20
- Website: Official website

History
- Opened: 14 February 1926; 100 years ago

Passengers
- FY2019: 13,562 daily

Services
Preceding station	Tōkyū Railways	Following station
Yokohama Terminus	Tōyoko Line Local	Higashi-Hakuraku towards Shibuya
Location
- Location within Yokohama Location within Kanagawa Prefecture Location within Tokyo Bay and Bōsō Peninsula Location within Japan

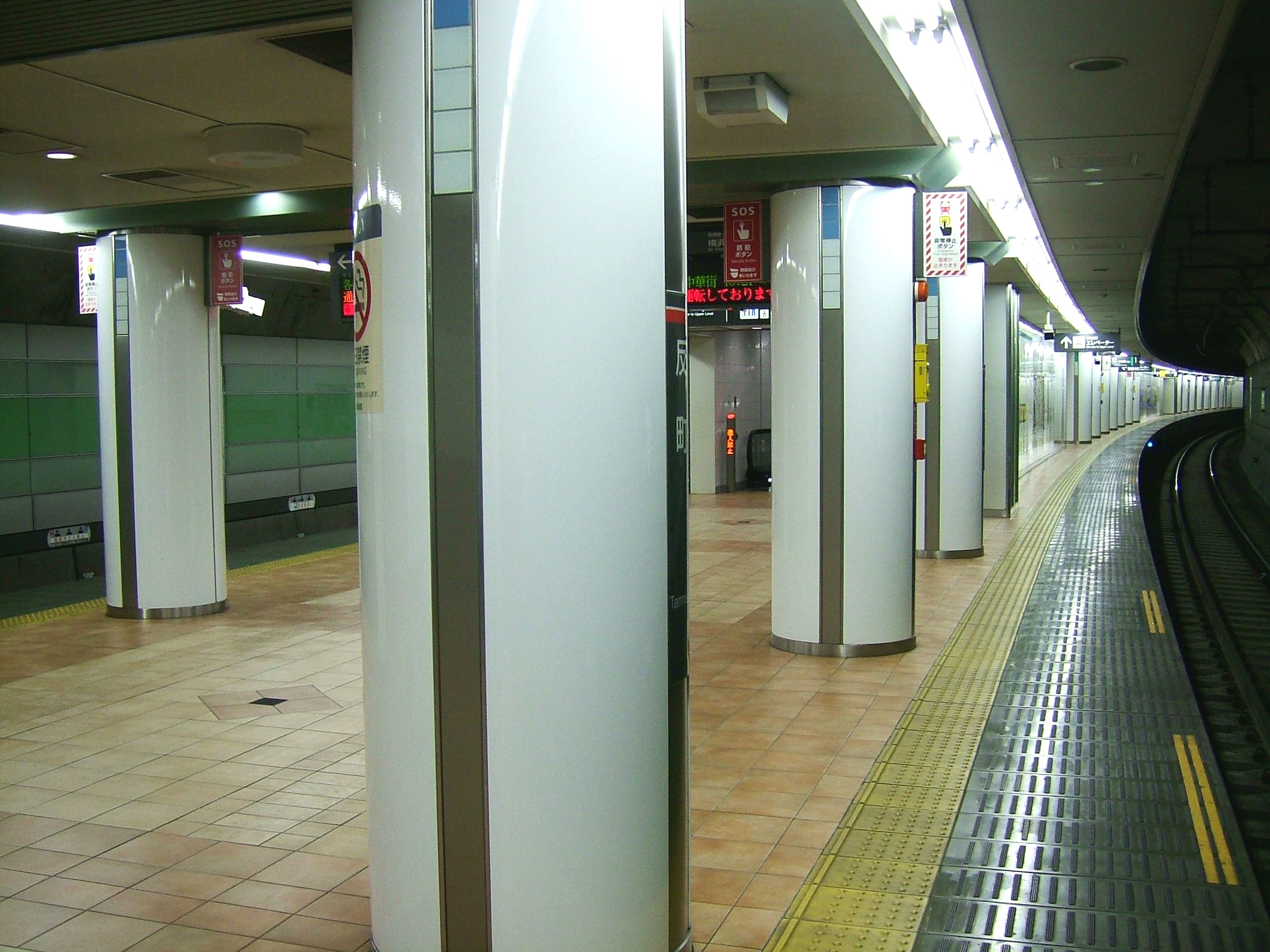
260pxPlatform

Tammachi Station (反町駅, Tanmachi-eki) is a passenger railway station located in Kanagawa-ku, Yokohama, Kanagawa Prefecture, Japan, operated by the private railway company Tokyu Corporation.

== Lines ==
Tammachi Station is served by the Tōkyū Tōyoko Line from Shibuya in Tokyo to Yokohama in Kanagawa Prefecture. It is 23.2 kilometers from the terminus of the line at Shibuya.

== Station layout ==
The station consists of a single island platform serving two tracks, located four stories underground from the station building.

=== Platforms ===
1	Tōkyū Tōyoko Line	for Yokohama; Minatomirai Line for Motomachi-Chūkagai
2	Tōkyū Tōyoko Line	for Musashi-Kosugi, Jiyūgaoka, Naka-Meguro, and Shibuya; Tokyo Metro Fukutoshin Line for Ikebukuro, Kotake-mukaihara, and Wakōshi; Seibu Ikebukuro Line for Hannō; Tōbu Tōjō Line for Shinrin-kōen

== History ==
Tammachi Station was opened on February 14, 1926. It was rebuilt on January 31, 2006, as an underground station. The new station building opened on March 28, 2008.

== Passenger statistics ==
In fiscal 2019, the station was used by an average of 13,562 passengers daily.

The passenger figures for previous years are as shown below.

Fiscal year	daily average
2005	14,115
2010	13,206
2015	12,620

== Surrounding area ==
- Japan National Route 1
- Kanagawa Station (5-minute walk)
- Higashi-Kanagawa Station (15 minutes on foot)
- Mitsuzawa-shimocho Station (10 minutes on foot)
- Kanagawa Ward Office

== See also ==
- List of railway stations in Japan
