= Higashi-hakuraku Station =

Railway station in Yokohama, Japan

Higashi-hakuraku Station 東白楽駅

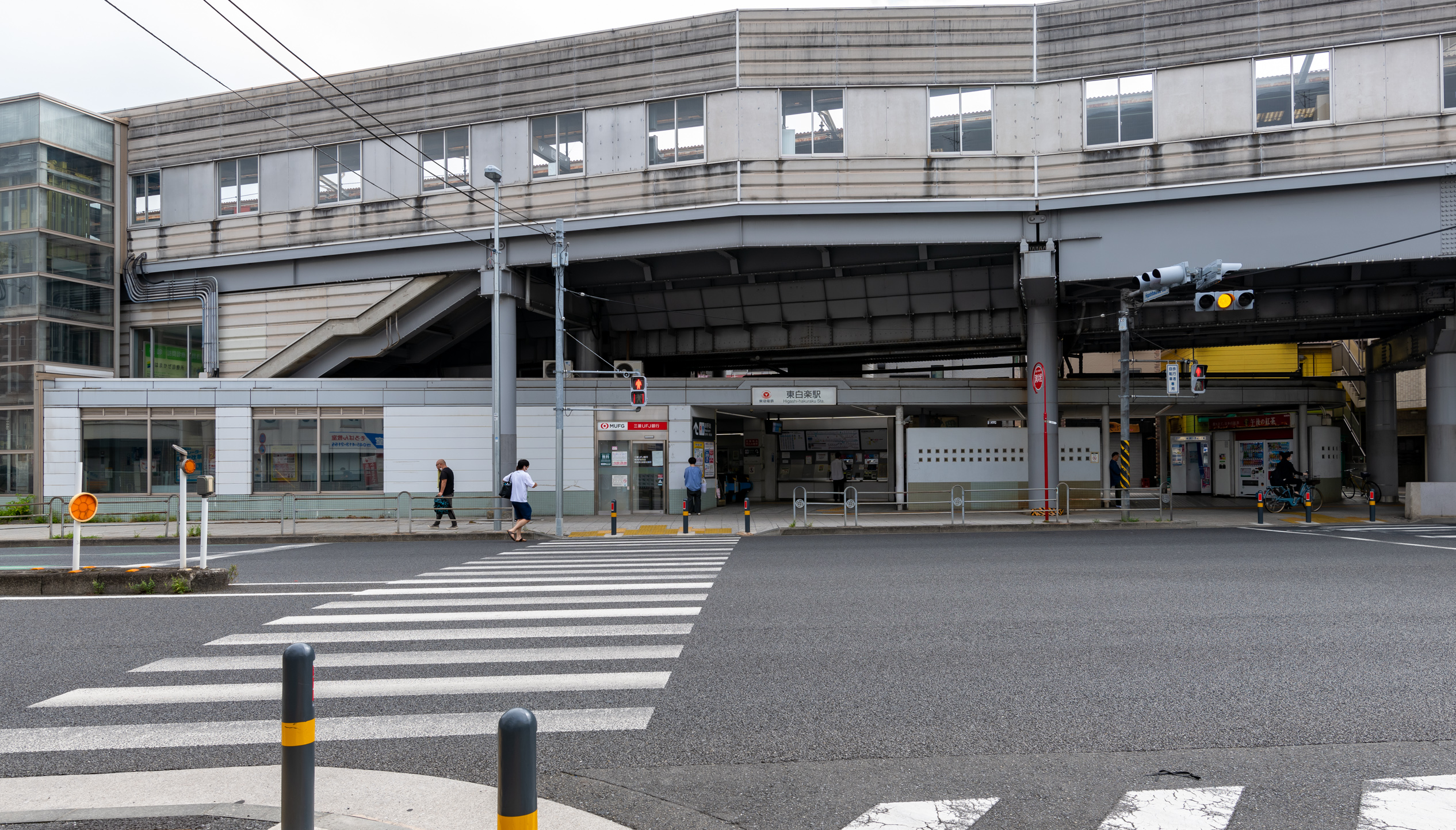
- Station house

General information
- Location: 12-1 Hakuraku, Kanagawa Ward, Yokohama City; Kanagawa Prefecture 221-0065; Japan
- Coordinates: 35.483265°N 139.629772°E
- Operator: Tōkyū Railways
- Line: Tōyoko Line
- Distance: 22.1 km (13.7 mi) from Shibuya
- Platforms: 2 side platforms
- Tracks: 2

Construction
- Structure type: Elevated

Other information
- Station code: TY19
- Website: Official website

History
- Opened: 10 March 1927; 99 years ago

Passengers
- FY2019: 15,031 daily

Services
Preceding station	Tōkyū Railways	Following station
Tammachi towards Yokohama	Tōyoko Line Local	Hakuraku towards Shibuya
Location
- Location within Yokohama Location within Kanagawa Prefecture Location within Tokyo Bay and Bōsō Peninsula Location within Japan

Higashi-hakuraku Station (東白楽駅, Higashi-hakuraku-eki) is a passenger railway station located in Kanagawa-ku, Yokohama, Kanagawa Prefecture, Japan, operated by the private railway company Tokyu Corporation.

== Lines ==
Higashi-hakuraku Station is served by the Tōkyū Tōyoko Line from Shibuya in Tokyo to Yokohama in Kanagawa Prefecture. It is 22.1 kilometers from the terminus of the line at Shibuya.

== Station layout ==
The station consists of two elevated opposed side-platforms, with the station building underneath.

=== Platforms ===
1	Tōkyū Tōyoko Line	for Yokohama; Minatomirai Line for Motomachi-Chūkagai
2	Tōkyū Tōyoko Line	for Musashi-Kosugi, Jiyūgaoka, Naka-Meguro, and Shibuya; Tokyo Metro Fukutoshin Line for Ikebukuro, Kotake-mukaihara, and Wakōshi; Seibu Ikebukuro Line for Hannō; Tōbu Tōjō Line for Shinrin-kōen

== History ==
Higashi-hakuraku Station was opened on March 10, 1927.

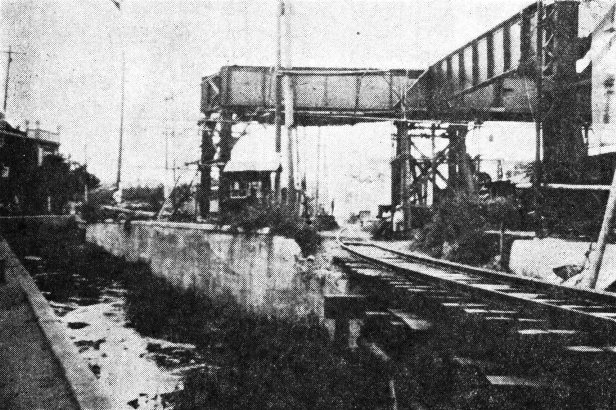
Construction of the elevated tracks at Higashi-Hakuraku Station, around 1930.

== Passenger statistics ==
In fiscal 2019, the station was used by an average of 15,031 passengers daily.

The passenger figures for previous years are as shown below.

Fiscal year	daily average
2005	13,127
2010	12,945
2015	13,491

== Surrounding area ==
- Kanagawa Prefectural Kanagawa Technical High School
- Kanagawa Prefectural Kanagawa Comprehensive High School
- Yokohama City Futatsuya Elementary School
- Yokohama Nishikanagawa Post Office
- Kanagawa Magistrate Court
- Kanagawa Ward Prosecutor's Office

== See also ==
- List of railway stations in Japan
