= Gakugei-daigaku Station =

Railway station in Tokyo, Japan

Coordinates: 35.628973°N 139.685382°E

Gakugei-daigaku Station 学芸大学駅

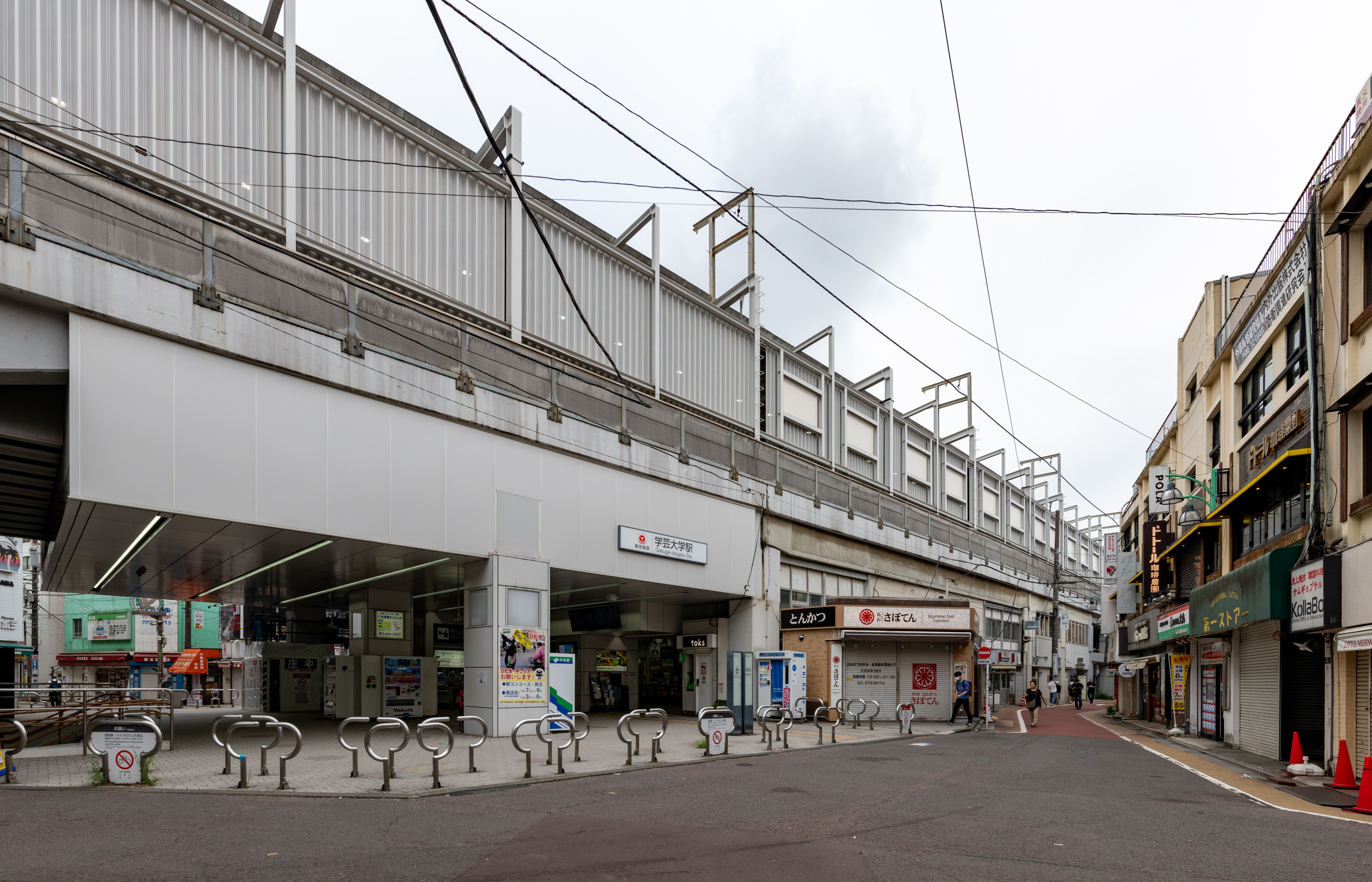
- Gakugei-daigaku Station, West Exit (August 2022)

General information
- Location: 3-2 Takaban, Meguro, Tōkyō 152-0004; Japan
- Operator: Tōkyū Railways
- Line: Tōyoko Line
- Distance: 4.2 km (2.6 mi) from Shibuya
- Platforms: 1 island platform
- Tracks: 2

Construction
- Structure type: Elevated

Other information
- Station code: TY05
- Website: Official website

History
- Opened: 28 August 1927; 98 years ago

Passengers
- 78,251 daily (2018)

Services
Preceding station	Tōkyū Railways	Following station
Jiyūgaoka towards Yokohama	Tōyoko Line Express	Naka-Meguro towards Shibuya
Toritsu-daigaku towards Yokohama	Tōyoko Line Local	Yūtenji towards Shibuya
Location
- Location within Special wards of Tokyo Location within Tokyo Bay and Bōsō Peninsula Location within Tokyo Location within Japan

Gakugei-daigaku Station (学芸大学駅, Gakugei-daigaku-eki) is an elevated station, located in Meguro, Tokyo, connected with Tokyu Toyoko Line.

== History ==
Gakugei-daigaku Station opened on 28 August 1927. It was named after the Tokyo Gakugei University, but the campus moved to Koganei in 1964. The Tokyo Gakugei University Senior High School opened in 1954 remains near this station.

== Lines ==
Gakugei-daigaku Station is served by the Tokyu Toyoko Line from Shibuya in Tokyo. It is located 4.2 km from the terminus of the line at Shibuya.

== Station layout ==
This elevated station consists of a single island platform serving two tracks.

=== Platforms ===
1
2
Tōyoko Line
Tōyoko Line
- for Jiyūgaoka, Musashi-kosugi, Kikuna, and Yokohama
- Minatomirai Line for Motomachi-Chūkagai
- Sotetsu Izumino Line for Shōnandai via the Tokyu/Sotetsu Shin-Yokohama Line
for Naka-meguro and Shibuya
Fukutoshin Line for Shinjuku-sanchōme, Ikebukuro, Kotake-mukaihara and Wakoshi
Seibu Ikebukuro Line for Hannō
Tobu Tojo Line for Shinrin-kōen

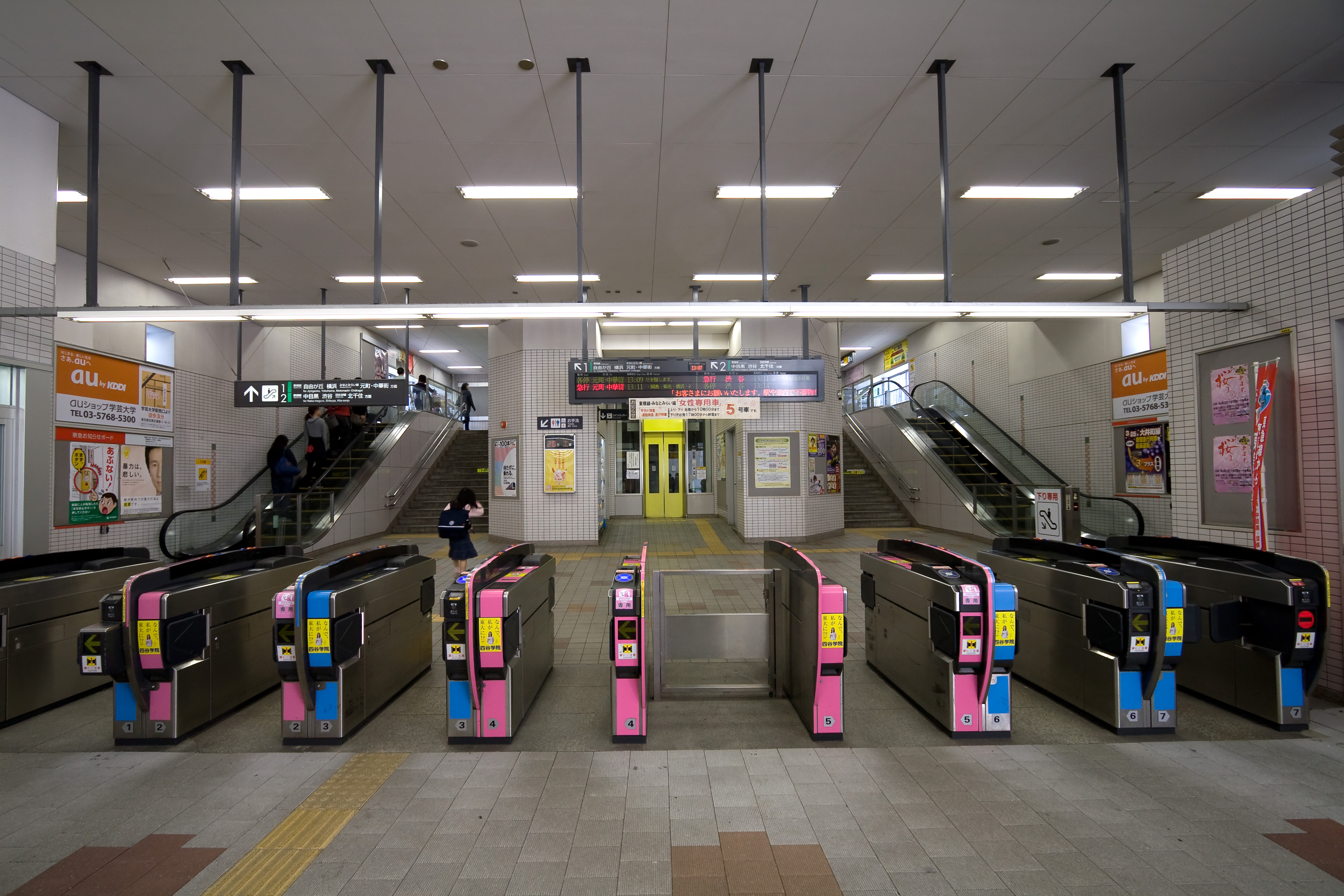
The ticket barriers in March 2009

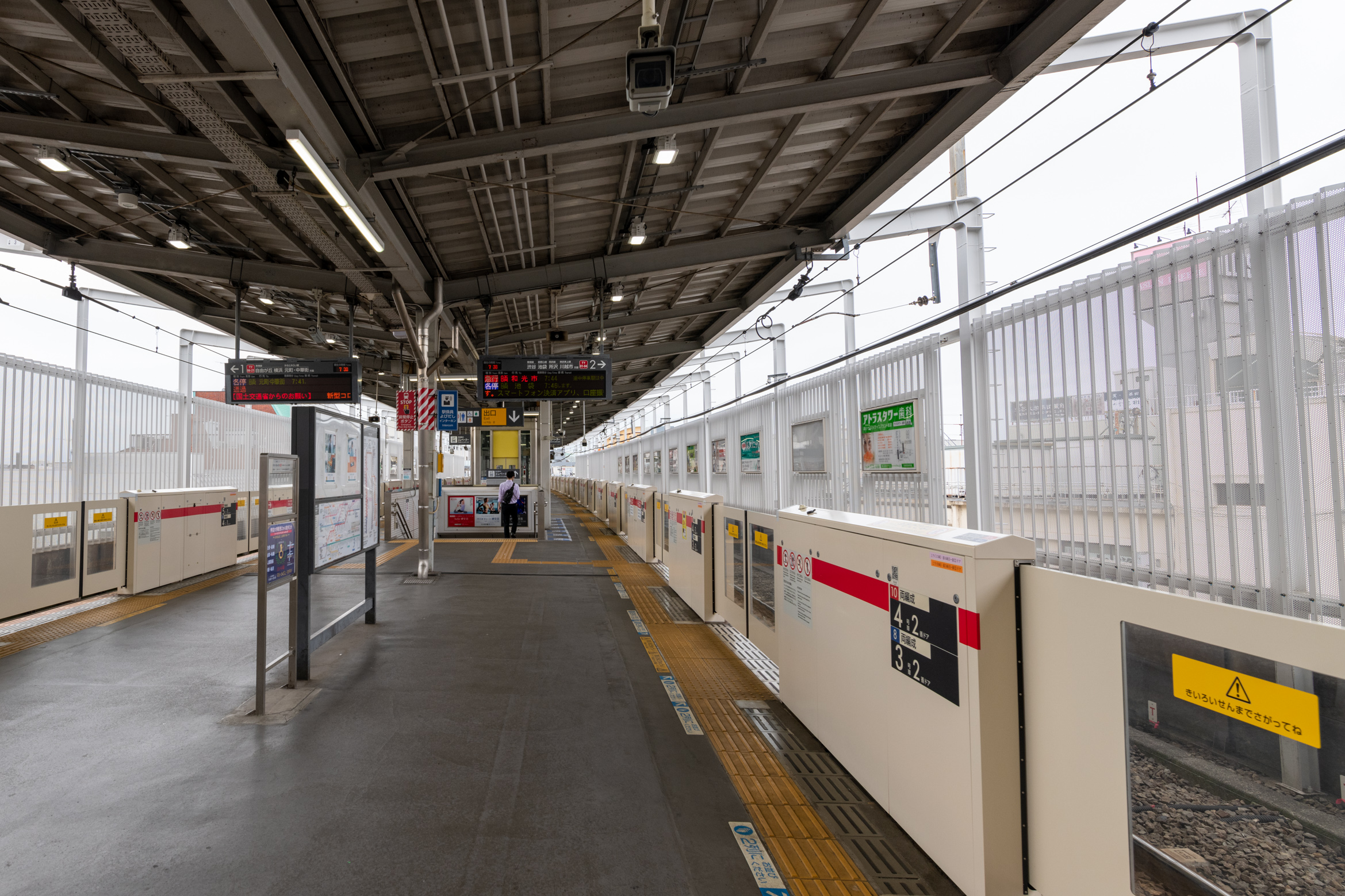
Platforms, August 2022

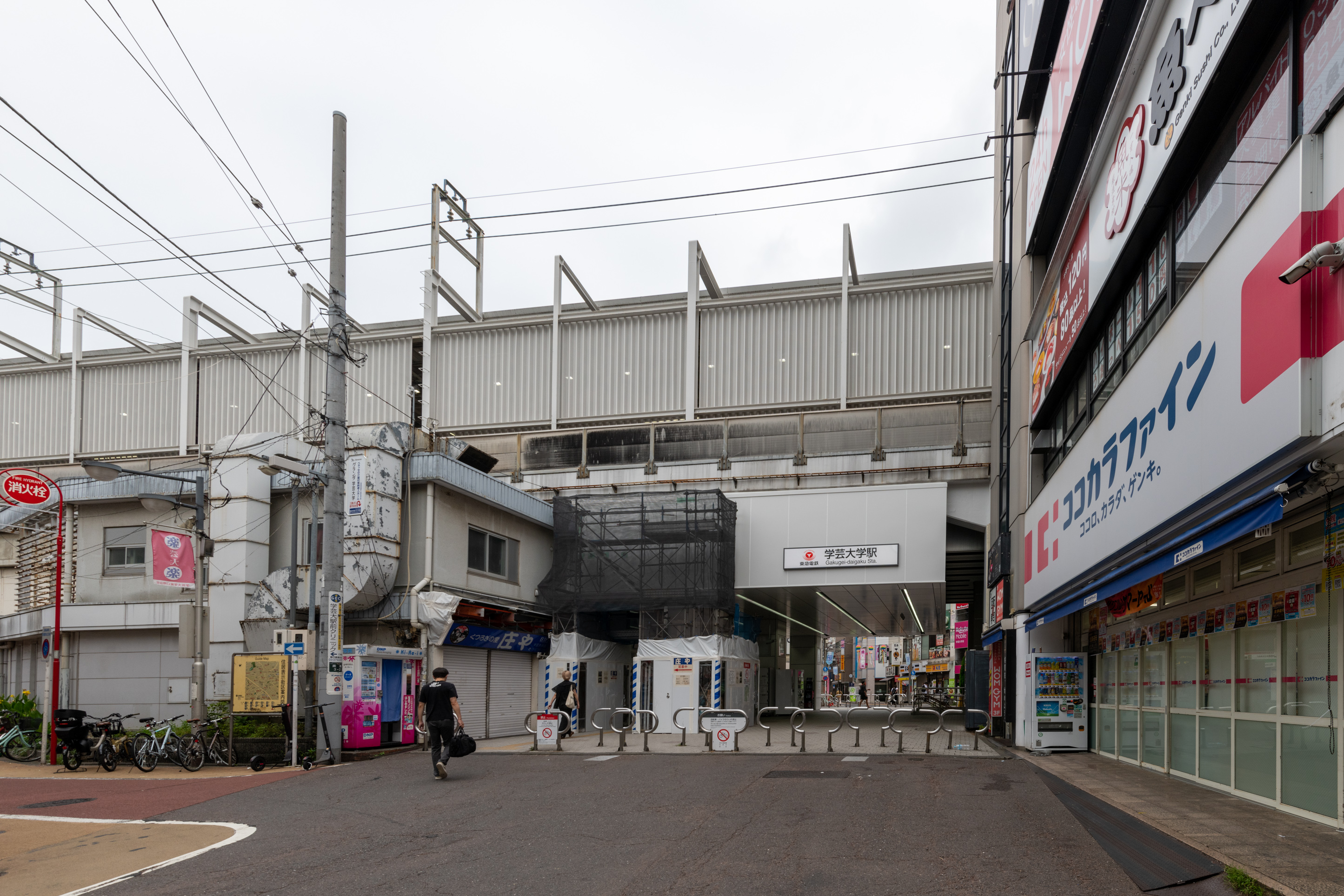
The east entrance, August 2022

== Passenger statistics ==
In fiscal year 2018, the station was used by an average of 78,251 passengers daily.

== See also ==
- List of railway stations in Japan
