= Tōyoko Line =

Railway line in Tokyo, Japan

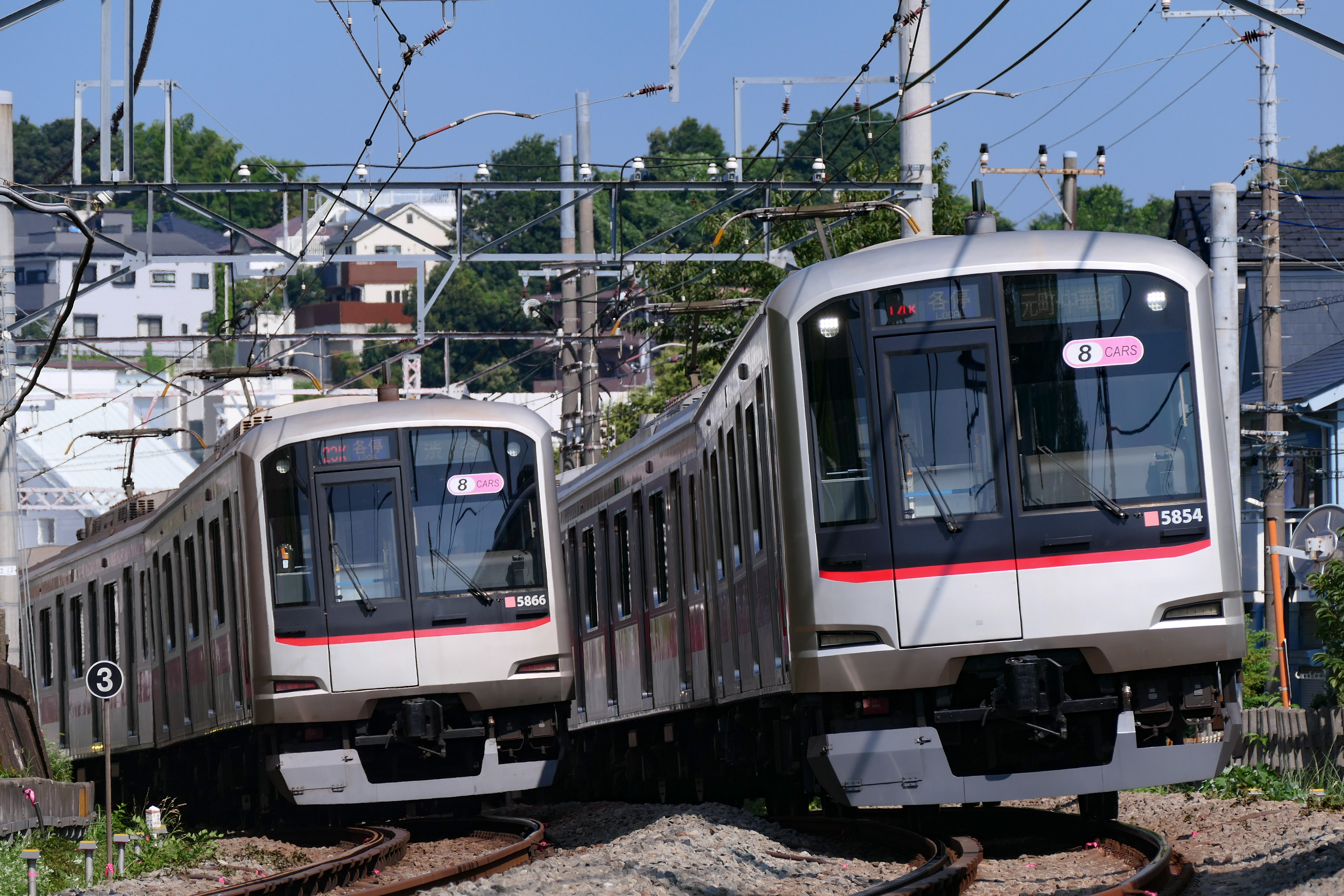
- Two Tōyoko Line 5050 series EMUs in 2019

Overview
- Native name: 東横線
- Status: In service
- Owner: Tokyu Corporation
- Line number: TY
- Locale: Kantō Region
- Termini: Yokohama; Shibuya
- Stations: 21
- Color on map: Crimson red

Service
- Type: Commuter rail
- System: Tokyu Railways
- Operator: Tokyu Corporation
- Depot: Motosumiyoshi
- Daily ridership: 1,239,968 (FY2018)

History
- Opened: 14 February 1926; 100 years ago

Technical
- Line length: 24.2 km (15.0 mi)
- Track gauge: 1,067 mm (3 ft 6 in)
- Electrification: Overhead line, 1,500 V DC
- Operating speed: 110 km/h (68 mph)
- Signalling: Cab signalling
- Train protection system: CS-ATC

The Tōyoko Line (Japanese: 東横線, Hepburn: Tōyoko-sen; Japanese pronunciation: [toː.jo.ko.seɴ]) is a major railway line connecting Tokyo (Shibuya) to Yokohama. The line is owned and operated by the private railway operator Tokyu Corporation. The name of the line, Tōyoko (東横; [toː.jo.ko]), is a combination of the first characters of Tōkyō (東京; [toː.kjoː]) and Yokohama (横浜; [jo.ko.ha.ma]), and is the main line of the Tokyu network. The section between Den-en-chofu and Hiyoshi Station is a quadruple track corridor with the Tōkyū Meguro Line.

== Services ==
Almost all services operate as a through service at one or both ends of the line onto other railway lines - refer to "Through Operation" below for details.

Upon opening of the Tōkyū Shin-yokohama Line in March 2023, the typical weekday off-peak services are as follows:

- Northbound: 18 tph of which 2 join the line from Hiyoshi
  - 2 tph ■F Liner for Shinrin-kōen via the Tokyo Metro Fukutoshin Line and Tōbu Tōjō Line
  - 2 tph ■F Liner for Kotesashi via the Tokyo Metro Fukutoshin Line, Seibu Yurakucho & Ikebukuro Line
  - 6 tph ■Express for Shibuya, some continuing to Wakoshi and Kawagoeshi via the Tokyo Metro Fukutoshin Line and Tōbu Tōjō Line
  - 6 tph ■Local for Shibuya, some continuing to Ikebukuro and Wakoshi via the Tokyo Metro Fukutoshin Line
  - 2 tph ■Local for Shakujii-kōen via the Tokyo Metro Fukutoshin Line, Seibu Yurakucho & Ikebukuro Line
- Southbound: 18 tph
  - 4 tph ■F Liner for Motomachi-Chukagai via the Minatomirai Line
  - 4 tph ■Express for Motomachi-Chukagai via the Minatomirai Line
  - 2 tph ■Express for Shonandai via the Tōkyū Shin-yokohama Line, Sōtetsu Shin-yokohama Line, Sōtetsu Main Line, and Sōtetsu Izumino Line
  - 8 tph ■Local for Motomachi-Chukagai via the Minatomirai Line

=== ■Limited Express (Tōyoko Express) ===
Limited Express (特急, Tokkyū) is the fastest service provided on the line at no extra charge. These types of trains can complete the journey between Shibuya and Motomachi-Chukagai in 35 minutes. Most Limited Express trains are through service to Tokyo Metro Fukutoshin Line and some to the Tobu Tojo Line or Seibu Ikebukuro Line via Fukutoshin Line. All Limited Express trains are through service to the Minatomirai Line. Trains that continuously and completely operate as express services through Tobu/Seibu, Tokyo Metro, Tokyu, and Yokohama Minatomirai railways are dubbed as "F-Liner" services. In daytime, connects to a local train at Jiyūgaoka, Musashi-Kosugi (Only inbound train passing a local train at Motosumiyoshi), and Kikuna.

=== ■Commuter Express ===
Commuter Express (通勤特急, Tsūkin Tokkyū) trains stop at all stations that Limited Express trains stop at, with the sole addition of Hiyoshi on the Toyoko Line. They operate in the AM and PM rush hours during the weekday when Limited Express trains are not operating. It is also guided as "Commuter Limited Express" in some cases. Most Commuter Limited Express trains will through operate into Tokyo Metro Fukutoshin Line as Commuter Express trains and beyond into the Tobu Tojo and Seibu Ikebukuro lines as Rapid services.

=== ■Express ===
Express (急行, Kyūkō) trains operate all day. Upbound-wise some Express Trains will through operate into Tokyo Metro Fukutoshin Line as local services. In daytime, connects to a local train at Jiyūgaoka and Kikuna. Downbound-wise, some Express Trains will through operate into Tōkyū Shin-Yokohama Line after Hiyoshi instead of continue onward to Yokohama/Motomachi-Chūkagai.

=== ■Local ===
Local (各駅停車, Kakueki-teisha) trains stop at all stations.

Most Limited Express and Express trains are 10 cars long, and all local trains are 8 cars long.

== Through operation ==
=== Tokyo Metro Fukutoshin Line ===
On 16 March 2013, the section of the Tōyoko line between Shibuya and Daikanyama Station was put underground, and connected to the Tokyo Metro Fukutoshin Line platforms at Shibuya. Through an engineering project culminating in a dramatic single overnight maneuver, the existing surface rail line was disconnected, sunken, and reconnected with the new underground line in time for the normal morning train schedule to run.

The re-routing allowed for through operation between the Tōyoko and Fukutoshin lines. Since opening of the Fukutoshin Line in 2008, trains would through operate between the Seibu Ikebukuro line (via Seibu Yurakucho line) and the Tobu Tojo line at the northern end of the Fukutoshin Line. The new connection allows trains from Tobu Railway, Seibu Railway, Tokyo Metro, Tokyu Corporation and Yokohama Minatomirai Railway to operate trains in a common corridor. As a result of the new connection, the original elevated Shibuya terminal for Tokyu trains was abandoned and demolished.

=== Minatomirai Line ===
On 1 February 2004, Tōyoko line was realigned underground between Tammachi and Yokohama stations to enable through services with the Minatomirai Line. The original alignment to Yokohama Station was demolished and turned into a rail trail.

=== Tokyo Metro Hibiya Line (discontinued) ===
Through operation with the Tokyo Metro Hibiya Line started on 29 August 1964, with trains starting at Hiyoshi station will travel into Kita-Senju Station via a connection to the Hibiya Line at Naka-Meguro Station. In 1988, this service was extended to Kikuna Station temporarily during the realignment of Hiyoshi station to an underground corridor, but was retained as official service due to its popularity.

On 15 March 2013, with the start of through service with Fukutoshin Line, services to and from the Hibiya Line were discontinued. Passengers must transfer between lines at Naka-Meguro Station.

=== Sōtetsu–Tōkyū Link Line ===
Through operation of the Tōkyū Shin-Yokohama Line and the Sōtetsu Shin-Yokohama Line started on 18 March 2023, allowing connections to the Tokaido Shinkansen line at Shin-yokohama. Train services begin Wakoshi station on the Fukutoshin Line and travel into Shin-yokohama and Shonandai via a connection to the Tōkyū Shin-yokohama Line at Hiyoshi Station.

In May 2006, both the Tokyu and Sagami Railway (Sōtetsu) announced a plan to build a 12.7 km (7.9 mi) long connection to allow through services between the Sōtetsu Main Line and Tōyoko Line. The connection starts at Hiyoshi Station and head to Sōtetsu Main Line's Nishiya Station. New stations are set up at Tsunashima Station, Shin-Yokohama Station and Hazawa Yokohama Kokudai Station. However, when a concrete plan was specified in November 2008 for Tsunashima station, the plan was changed to the establishment of a "Shin-tsunashima Station" to be constructed near Tsunashima station.

== Stations ==
Local trains stop at all stations. Legend:

- ● : Trains stop
- | : Trains pass

No.	Station	Distance in km (mi)	Express	Commuter express	F Liner	S-train	Transfers	Location	
↑ Through-running to/from ↑ Shinrin-kōen via the Tokyo Metro Fukutoshin and Tōbu Tōjō lines Hannō via the Tokyo Metro Fukutoshin, Seibu Yūrakuchō, and Seibu Ikebukuro lines
TY-01	Shibuya 渋谷	0 (0)	●	●	●	●	Den-en-toshi Line (DT01); Yamanote Line (JY20); Saikyō Line (JA11); Shōnan–Shinjuku Line (JS19); Inokashira Line (IN01); Ginza Line (G-01); Hanzōmon Line (Z-01); Fukutoshin Line (F-16; through service)	Shibuya, Tokyo	
TY-02	Daikan-yama 代官山	1.5 (0.93)	|	|	|	|		Shibuya, Tokyo	
TY-03	Naka-Meguro 中目黒	2.2 (1.4)	●	●	●	|	Hibiya Line (H-01)	Meguro, Tokyo	
TY-04	Yūtenji 祐天寺	3.2 (2.0)	|	|	|	|		Meguro, Tokyo	
TY-05	Gakugei-daigaku 学芸大学	4.2 (2.6)	●	|	|	|		Meguro, Tokyo	
TY-06	Toritsu-daigaku 都立大学	5.6 (3.5)	|	|	|	|		Meguro, Tokyo	
TY-07	Jiyūgaoka 自由が丘	7.0 (4.3)	●	●	●	●	Ōimachi Line (OM10)	Meguro, Tokyo	
TY-08	Den-en-chōfu 田園調布	8.2 (5.1)	●	|	|	|	Meguro Line (MG08)	Ōta, Tokyo	
TY-09	Tamagawa 多摩川	9.0 (5.6)	●	|	|	|	Meguro Line (MG09); Tōkyū Tamagawa Line (TM01)	Ōta, Tokyo	
TY-10	Shin-maruko 新丸子	10.3 (6.4)	|	|	|	|	Meguro Line (MG10)	Nakahara-ku, Kawasaki	Kanagawa; Prefecture
TY-11	Musashi-Kosugi 武蔵小杉	10.8 (6.7)	●	●	●	|	Meguro Line (MG11); Nambu Line (JN07); Yokosuka Line (JO15); Shōnan–Shinjuku Line (JS15); Sōtetsu–JR Link Line (JS15)	Nakahara-ku, Kawasaki	Kanagawa; Prefecture
TY-12	Motosumiyoshi 元住吉	12.1 (7.5)	|	|	|	|	Meguro Line (MG12)	Nakahara-ku, Kawasaki	Kanagawa; Prefecture
TY-13	Hiyoshi 日吉	13.6 (8.5)	●	●	|	|	Meguro Line (MG13); Tōkyū Shin-Yokohama Line (SH03; through service); Green Line (G10)	Kōhoku-ku, Yokohama	Kanagawa; Prefecture
↓ Through-running of some express trains to/from Shōnandai or Ebina via Shin-Yokohama, Sōtetsu Shin-Yokohama, Sōtetsu Main, and Sōtetsu Izumino lines ↓
TY-14	Tsunashima 綱島	15.8 (9.8)	●	|	|	|		Kōhoku, Yokohama	Kanagawa; Prefecture
TY-15	Ōkurayama 大倉山	17.5 (10.9)	|	|	|	|		Kōhoku, Yokohama	Kanagawa; Prefecture
TY-16	Kikuna 菊名	18.8 (11.7)	●	●	●	|	Yokohama Line (JH15)	Kōhoku, Yokohama	Kanagawa; Prefecture
TY-17	Myōrenji 妙蓮寺	20.2 (12.6)	|	|	|	|		Kōhoku, Yokohama	Kanagawa; Prefecture
TY-18	Hakuraku 白楽	21.4 (13.3)	|	|	|	|		Kanagawa-ku, Yokohama	Kanagawa; Prefecture
TY-19	Higashi-hakuraku 東白楽	22.1 (13.7)	|	|	|	|		Kanagawa-ku, Yokohama	Kanagawa; Prefecture
TY-20	Tammachi 反町	23.2 (14.4)	|	|	|	|		Kanagawa-ku, Yokohama	Kanagawa; Prefecture
TY-21	Yokohama 横浜	24.2 (15.0)	●	●	●	●	Tōkaidō Line (JT05); Keihin–Tōhoku Line (JK12); Yokohama Line (JK12); Negishi Line (JK12); Yokosuka Line (JO13); Shōnan–Shinjuku Line (JS13); Main Line (KK37); Sōtetsu Main Line (SO01); Minatomirai Line (MM01; through service); Blue Line (B20)	Nishi-ku, Yokohama	Kanagawa; Prefecture
↓ Through-running of some express trains to/from Motomachi-Chūkagai via the Minatomirai Line ↓

== Rolling stock ==
- Tokyu 5000 series 8-car EMUs
- Tokyu 5050 series 8-car EMUs
- Tokyu 5050-4000 series 10-car EMUs
- Yokohama Minatomirai Y500 series 8-car EMUs
- Tokyo Metro 10000 series 10-car EMUs (since September 2012)
- Tokyo Metro 17000 series 8/10-car EMUs (since February 2021)
- Tobu 9000 series 10-car EMUs (since March 2013)
- Tobu 50070 series 10-car EMUs (since March 2013)
- Seibu 6000 series 10-car EMUs (since March 2013)
- Seibu 40000 series 10-car EMUs (since 25 March 2017)
- Sotetsu 20000 series 10-car EMUs (since 18 March 2023)

Eight-car Tokyo Metro 10000 series sets entered revenue service on the Tokyu Tōyoko Line and Minatomirai Line from 7 September 2012. These 8-car sets were subsequently reformed back into 10-car sets.

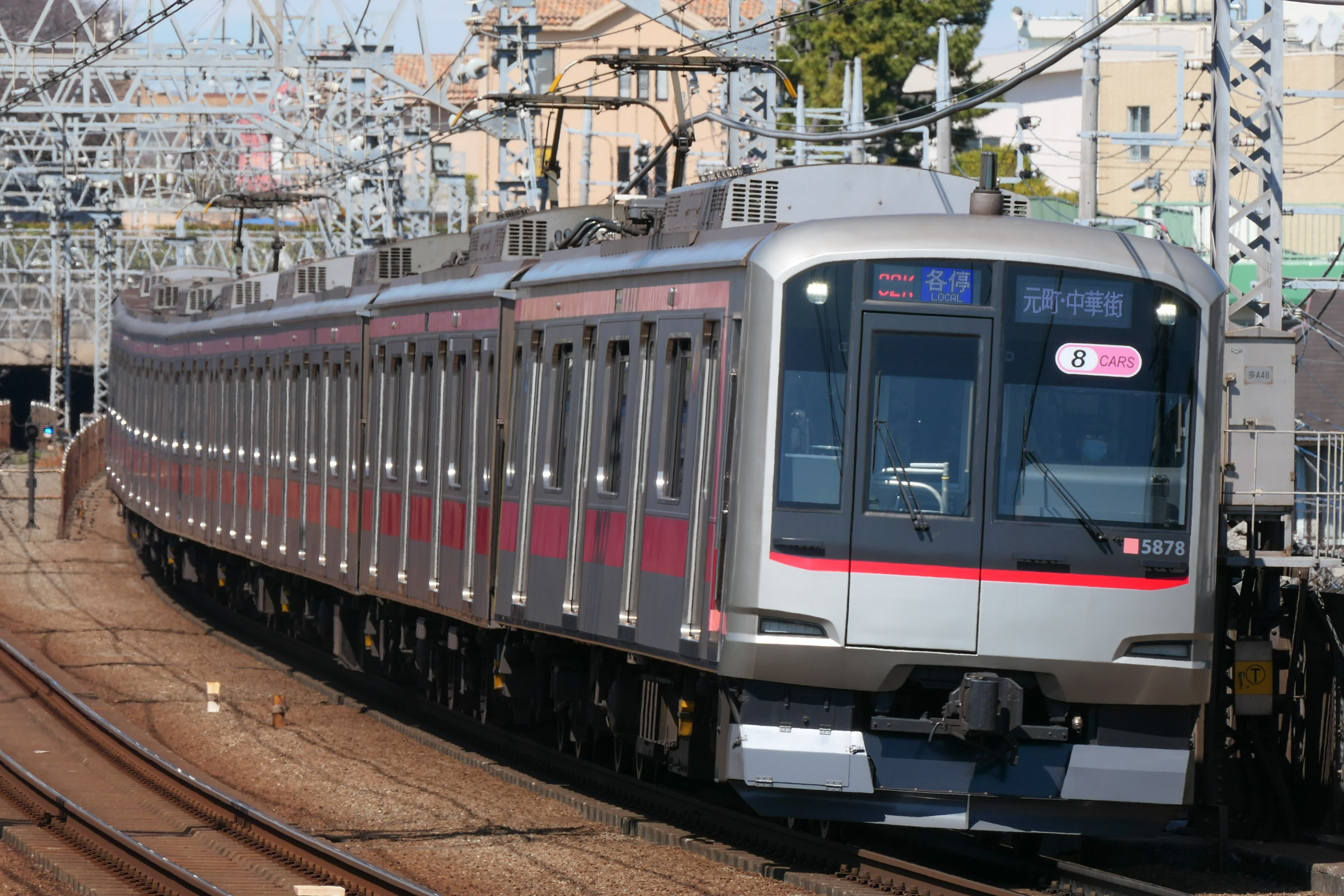
Tokyu 5050 series

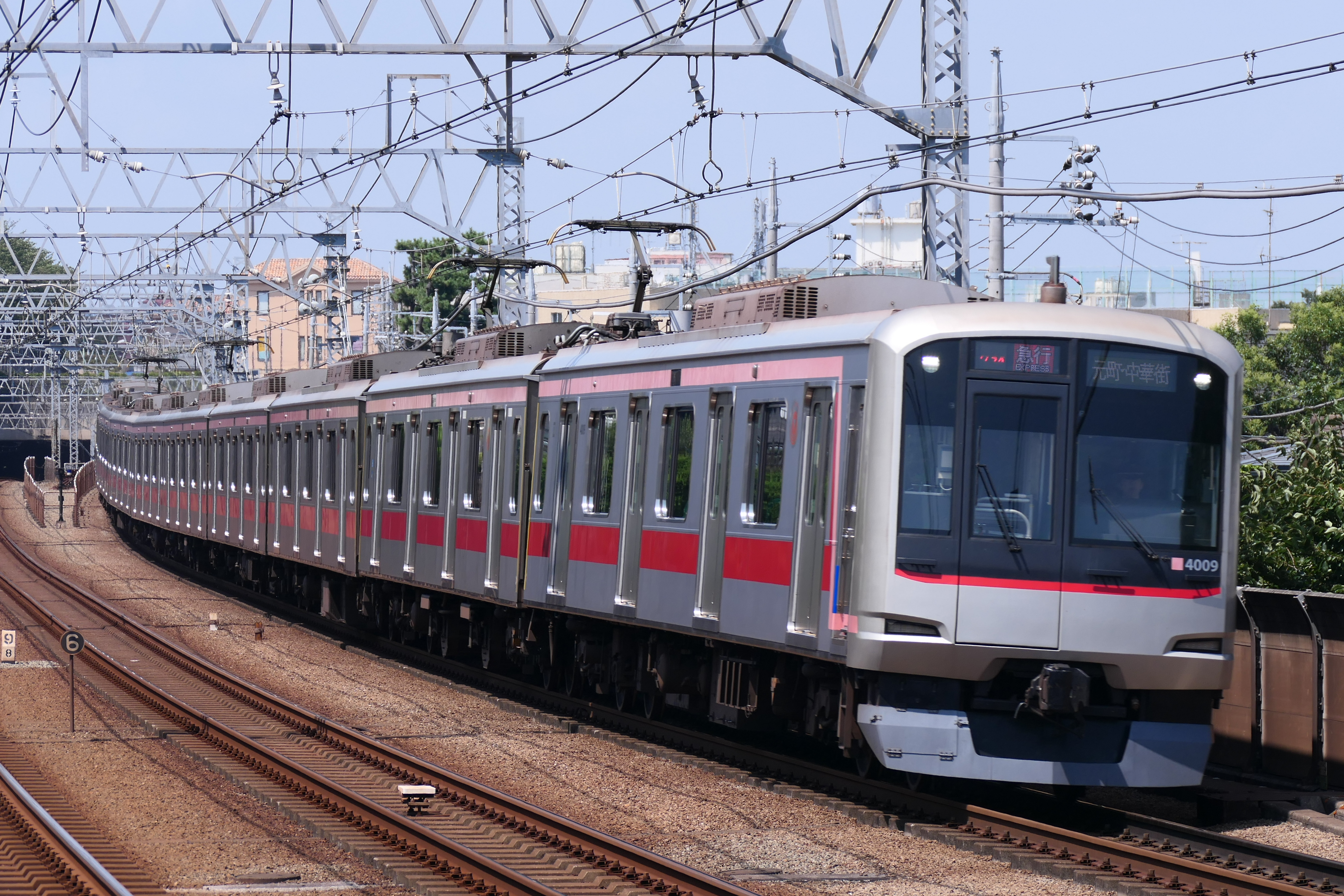
Tokyu 5050-4000 series

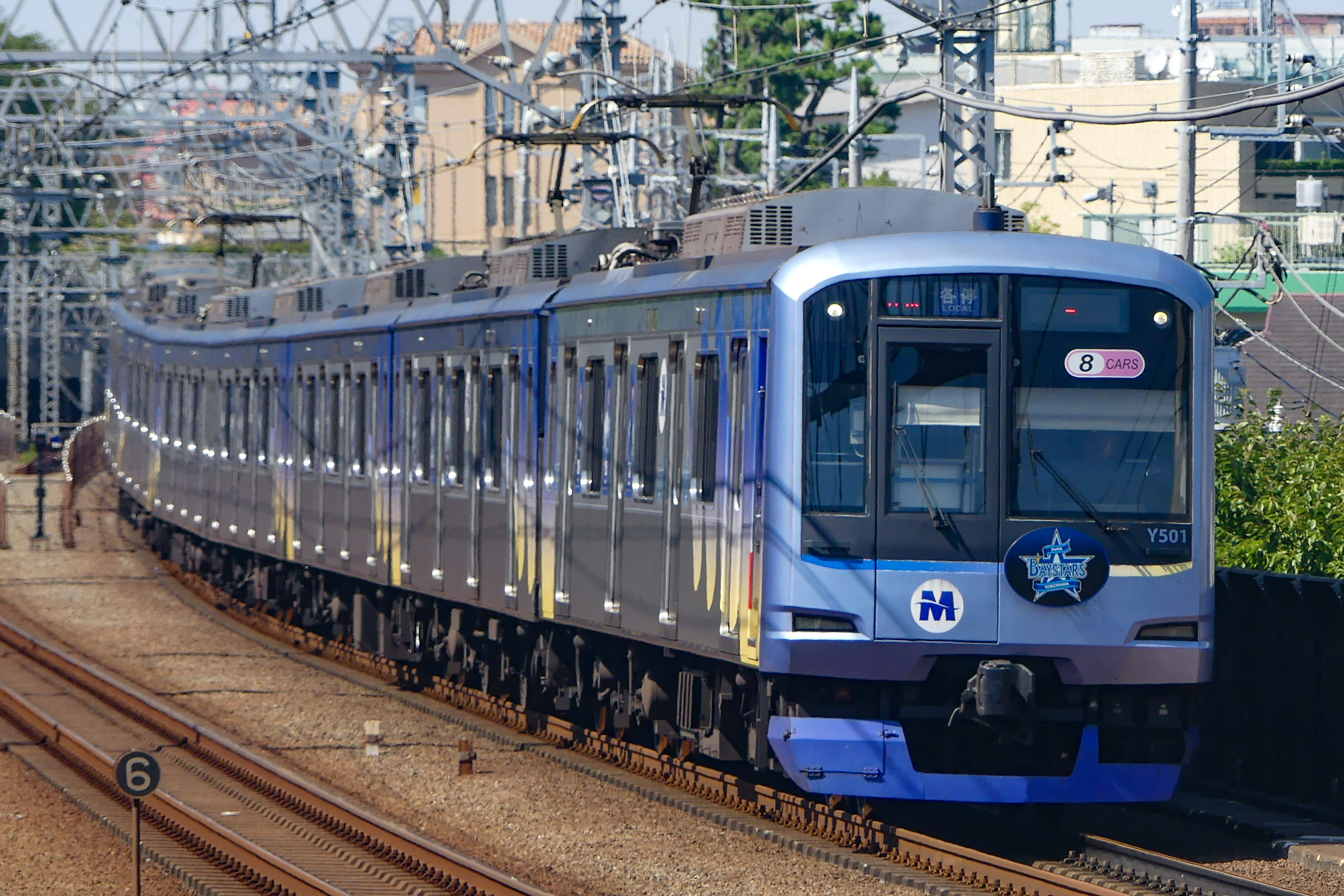
Y500 series

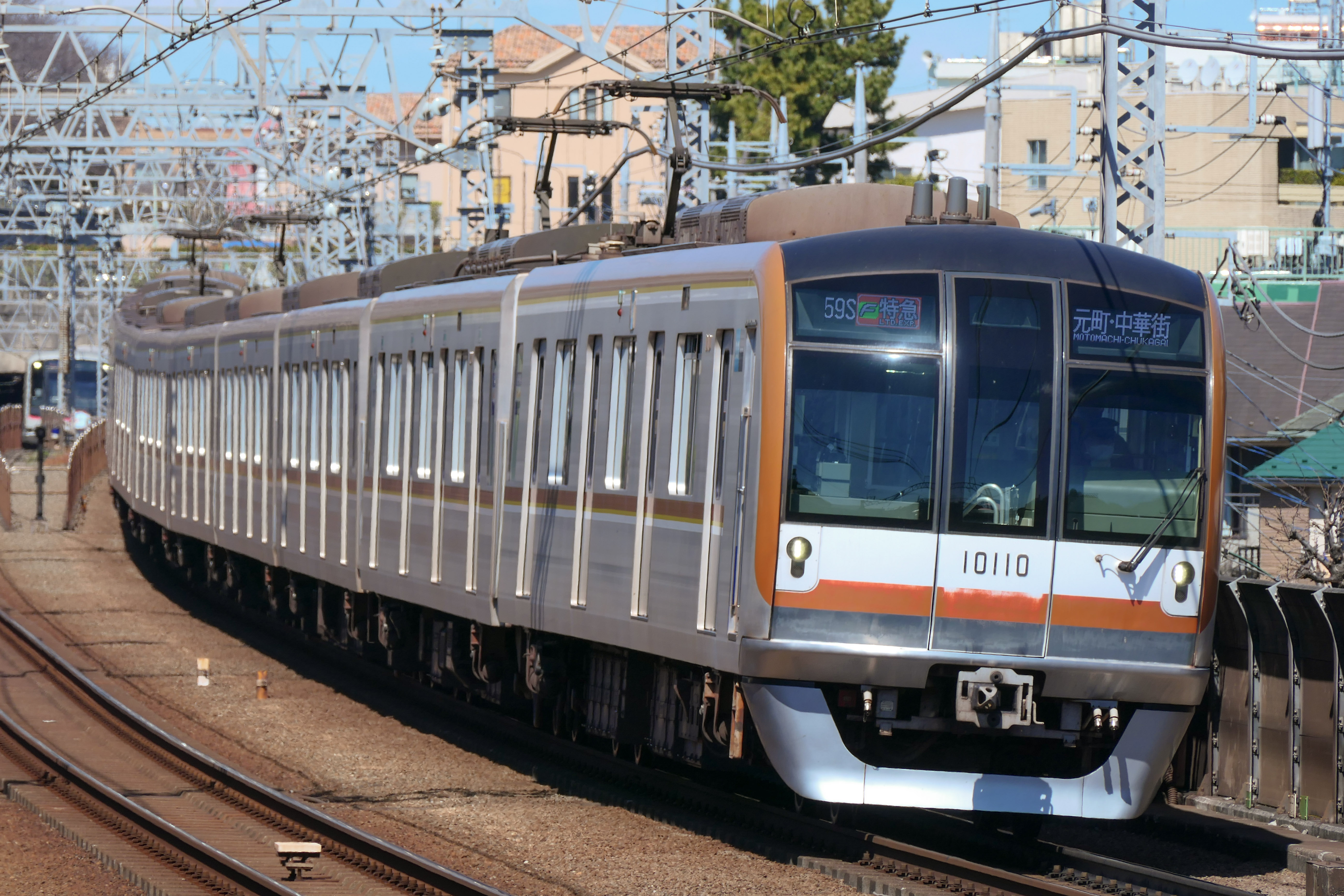
Tokyo Metro 10000 series

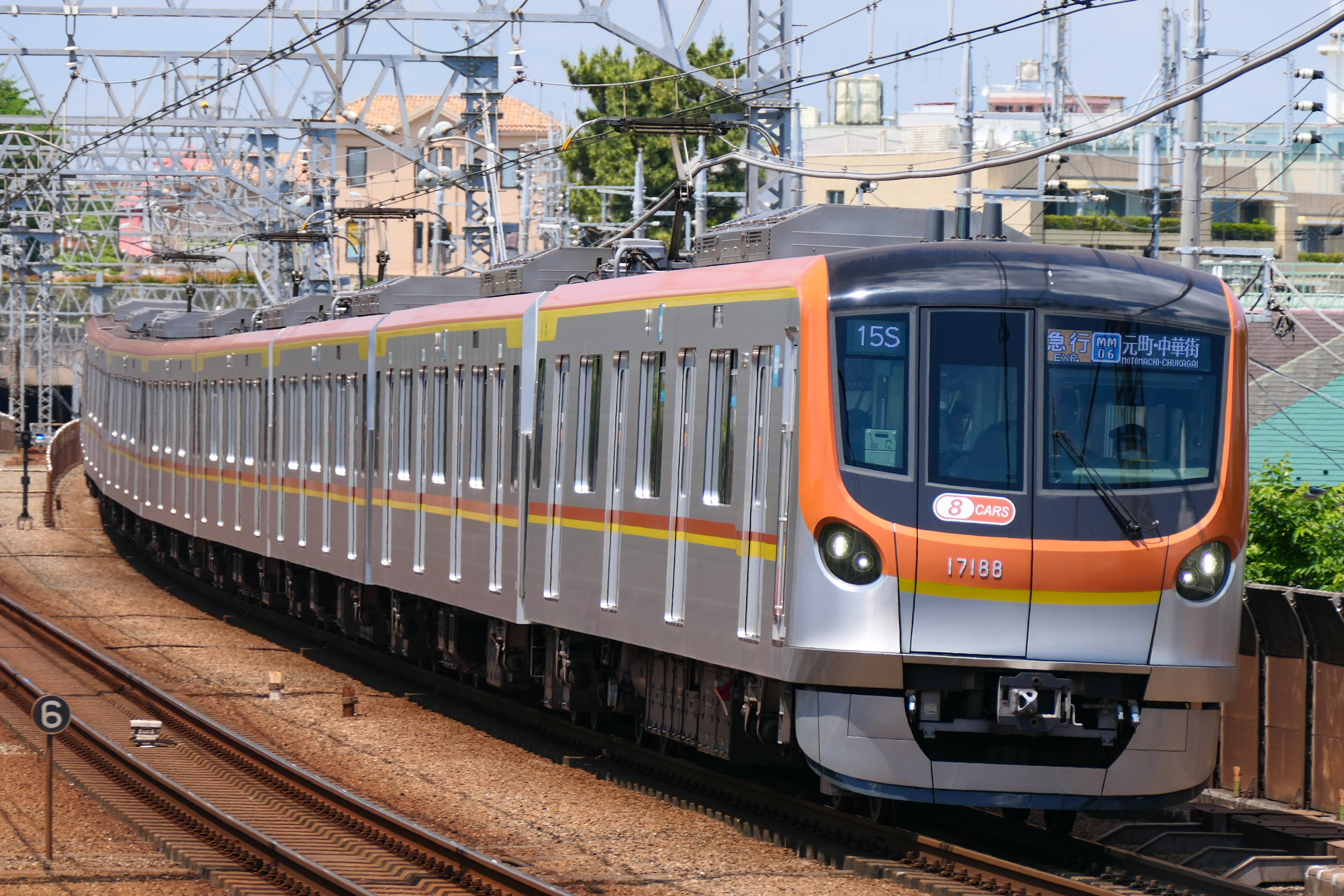
Tokyo Metro 17000 series

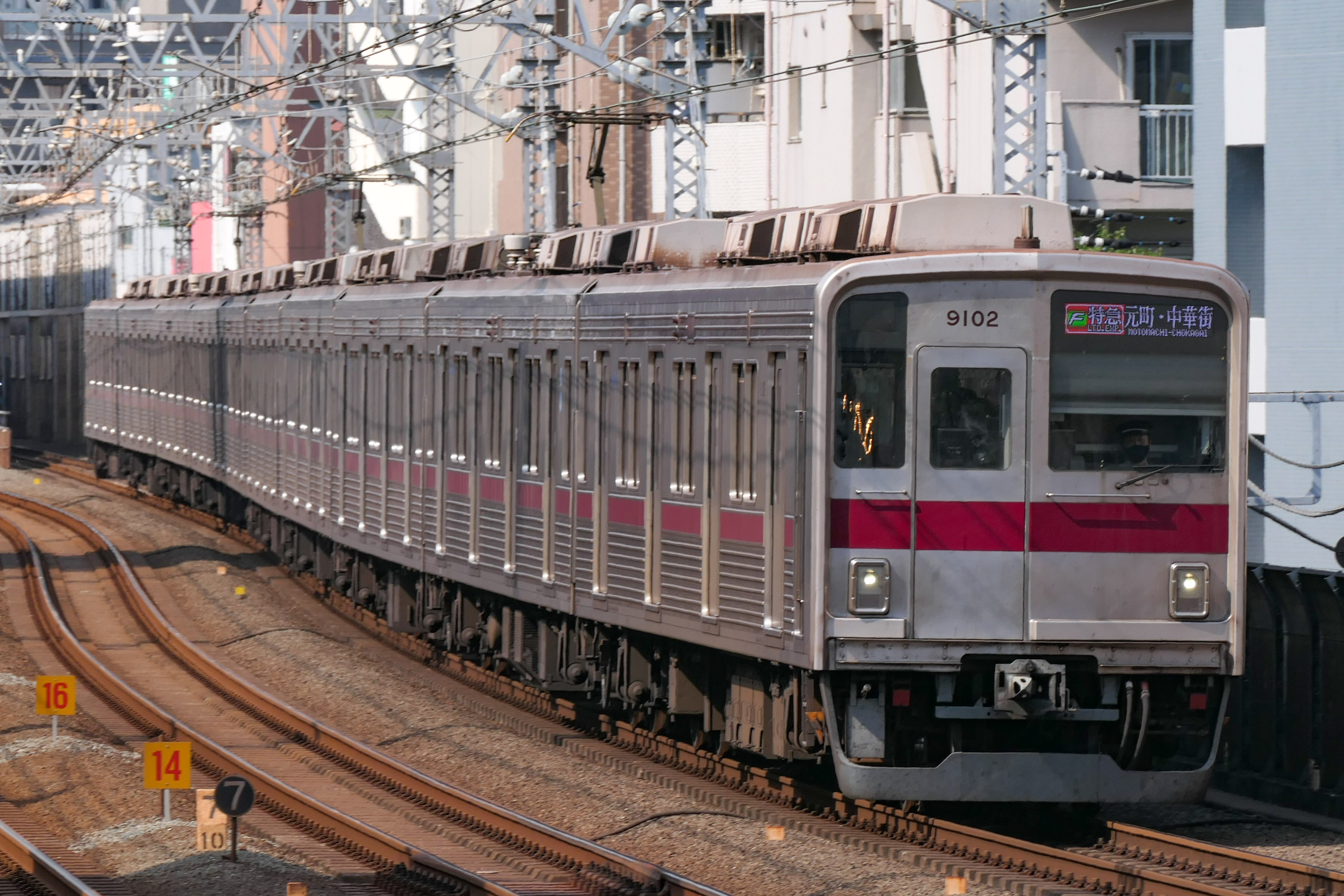
Tobu 9000 series

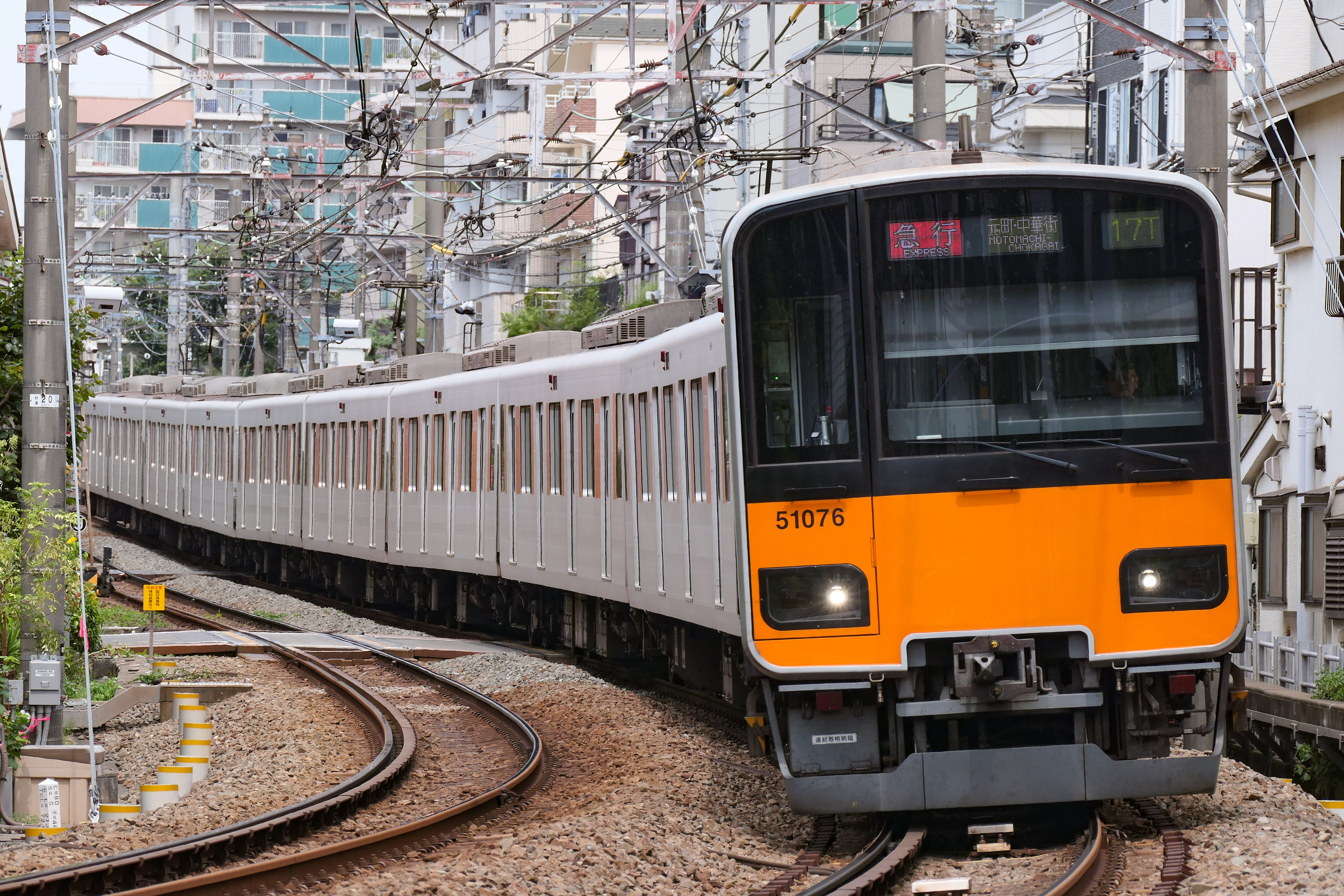
Tobu 50070 series

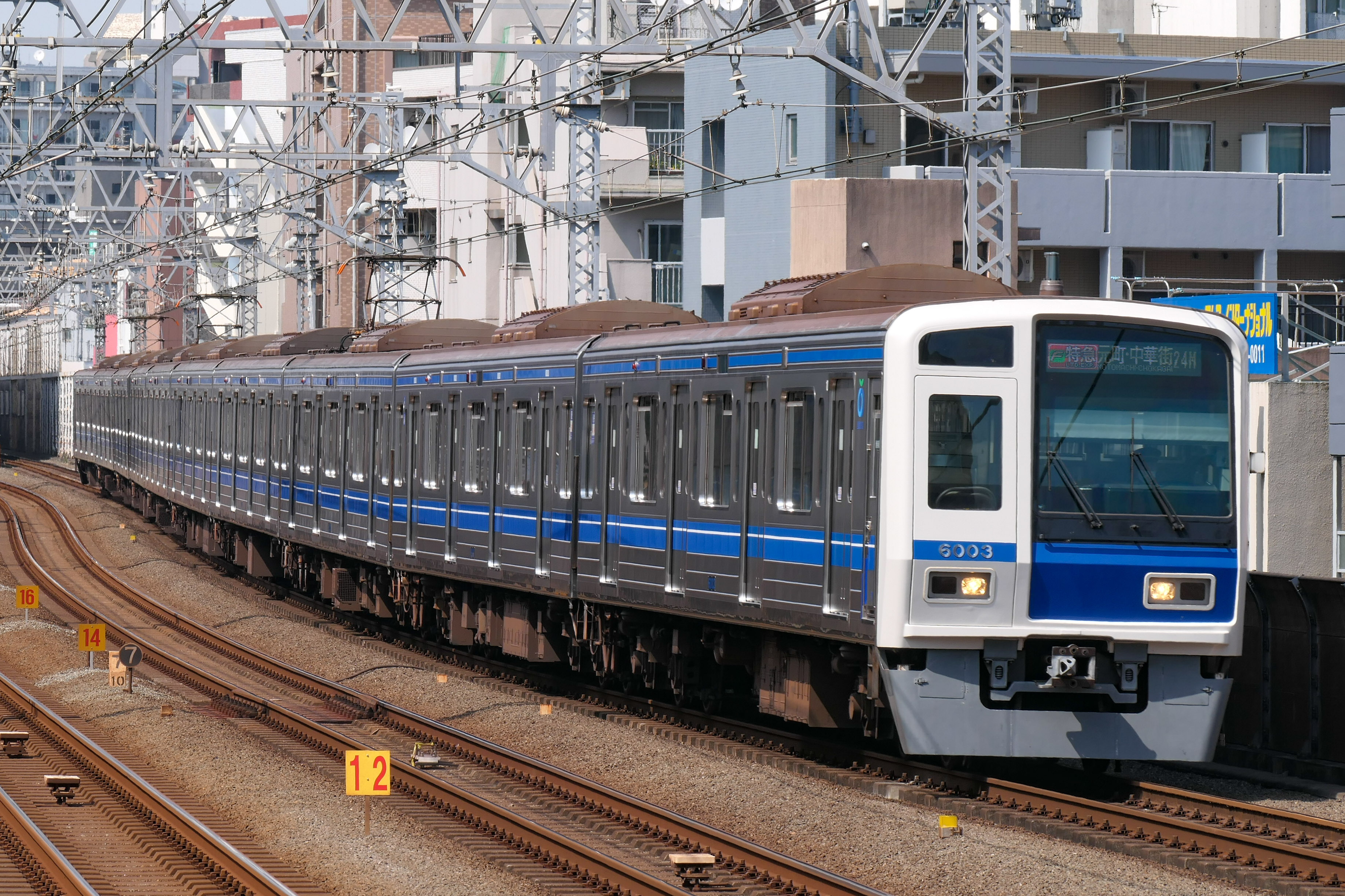
Seibu 6000 series

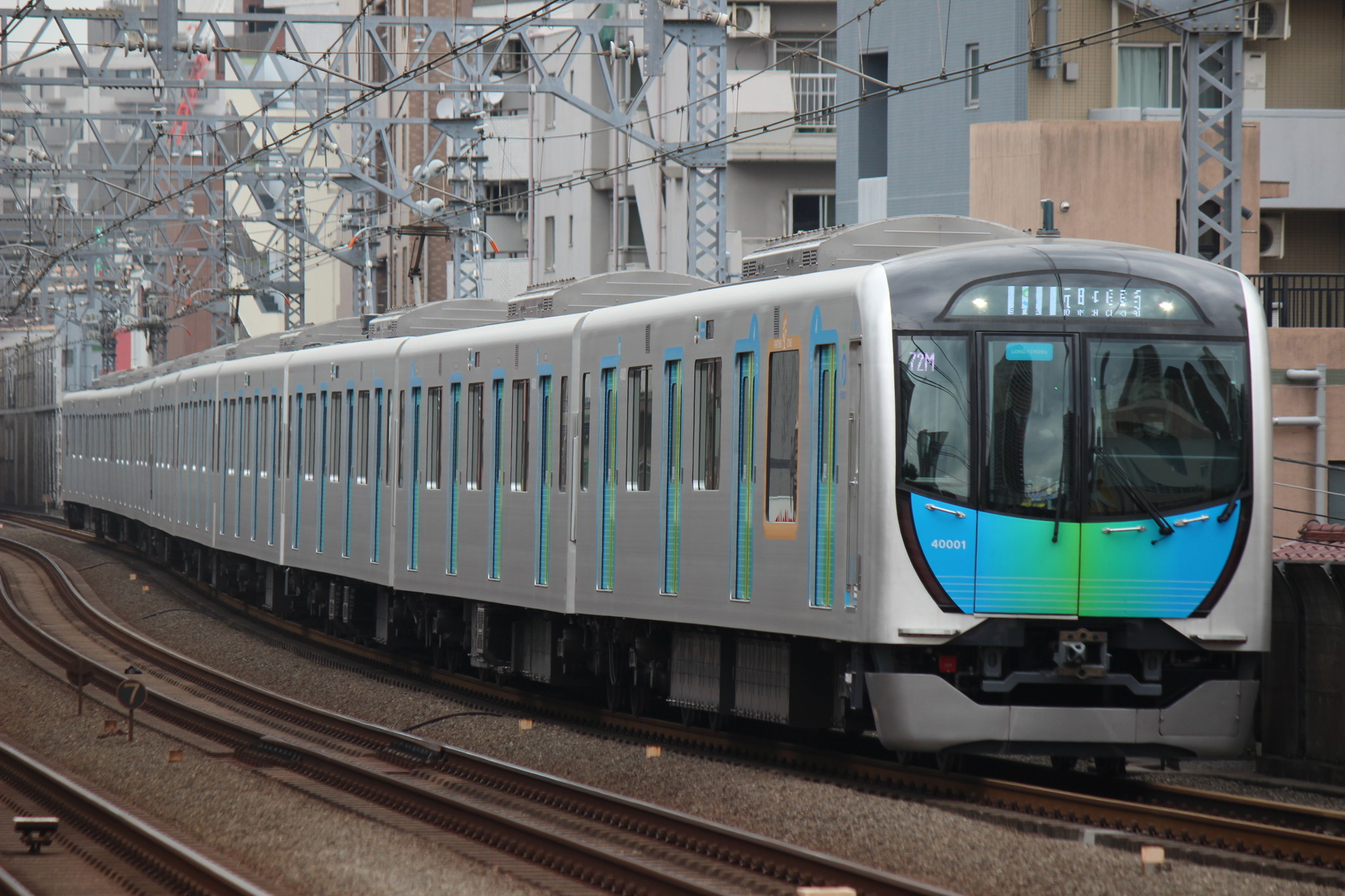
Seibu 40000 series

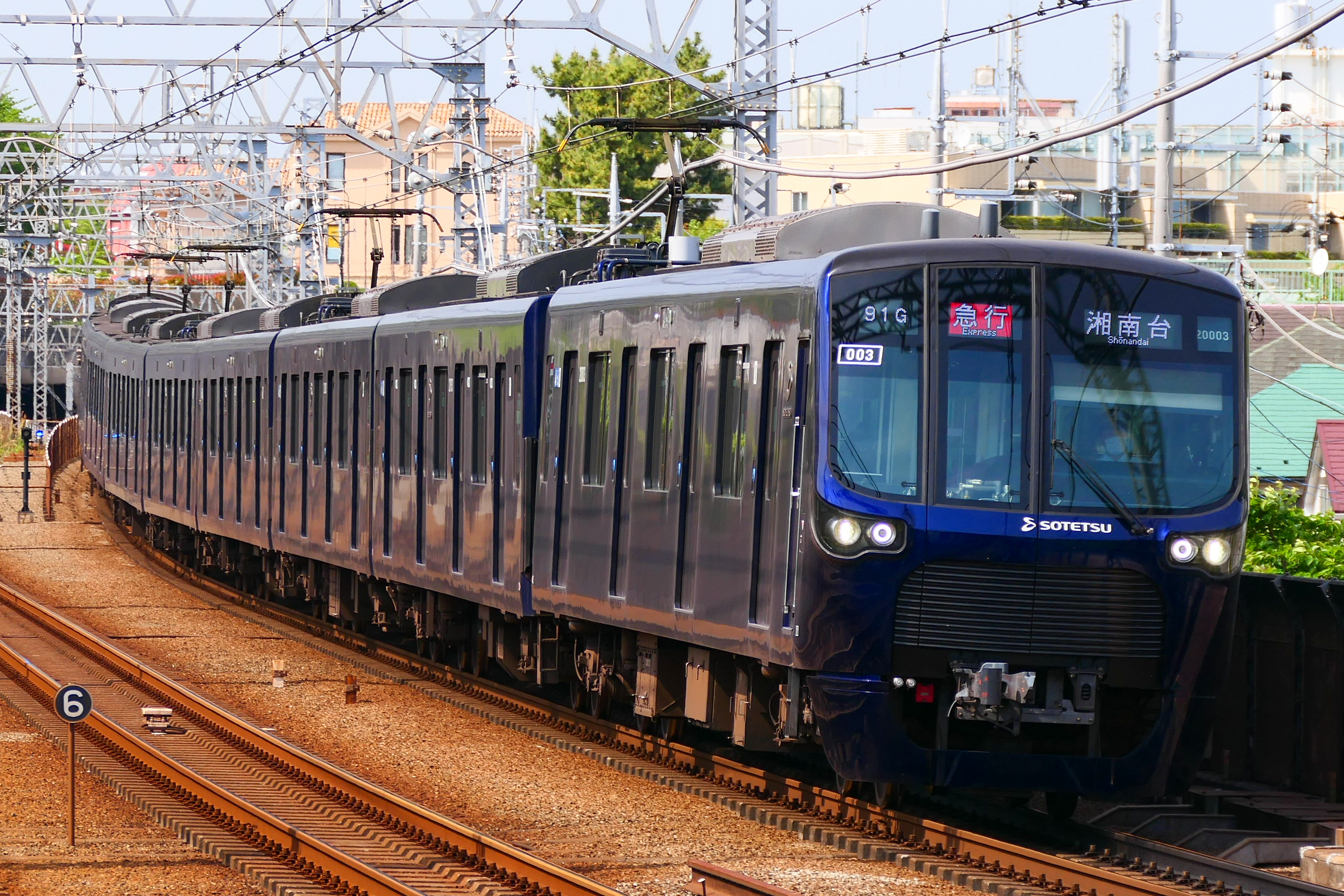
Sotetsu 20000 Series

=== Former rolling stock ===
- Tokyu 1000 series 8-car EMUs
- Tokyu 3000 series 8-car EMU
- Tokyu 8000 series 8-car EMUs
- Tokyu 8090 series 8-car EMUs
- Tokyu 8500 series 8-car EMUs
- Tokyu 9000 series 8-car EMUs (until 15 March 2013)
- Tokyo Metro 03 series (until 15 March 2013)
- Tokyo Metro 7000 series 8/10-car EMUs (from September 2012 until April 2022)
- Seibu 6050 series 10-car EMUs (since March 2013 until 30 March 2024)
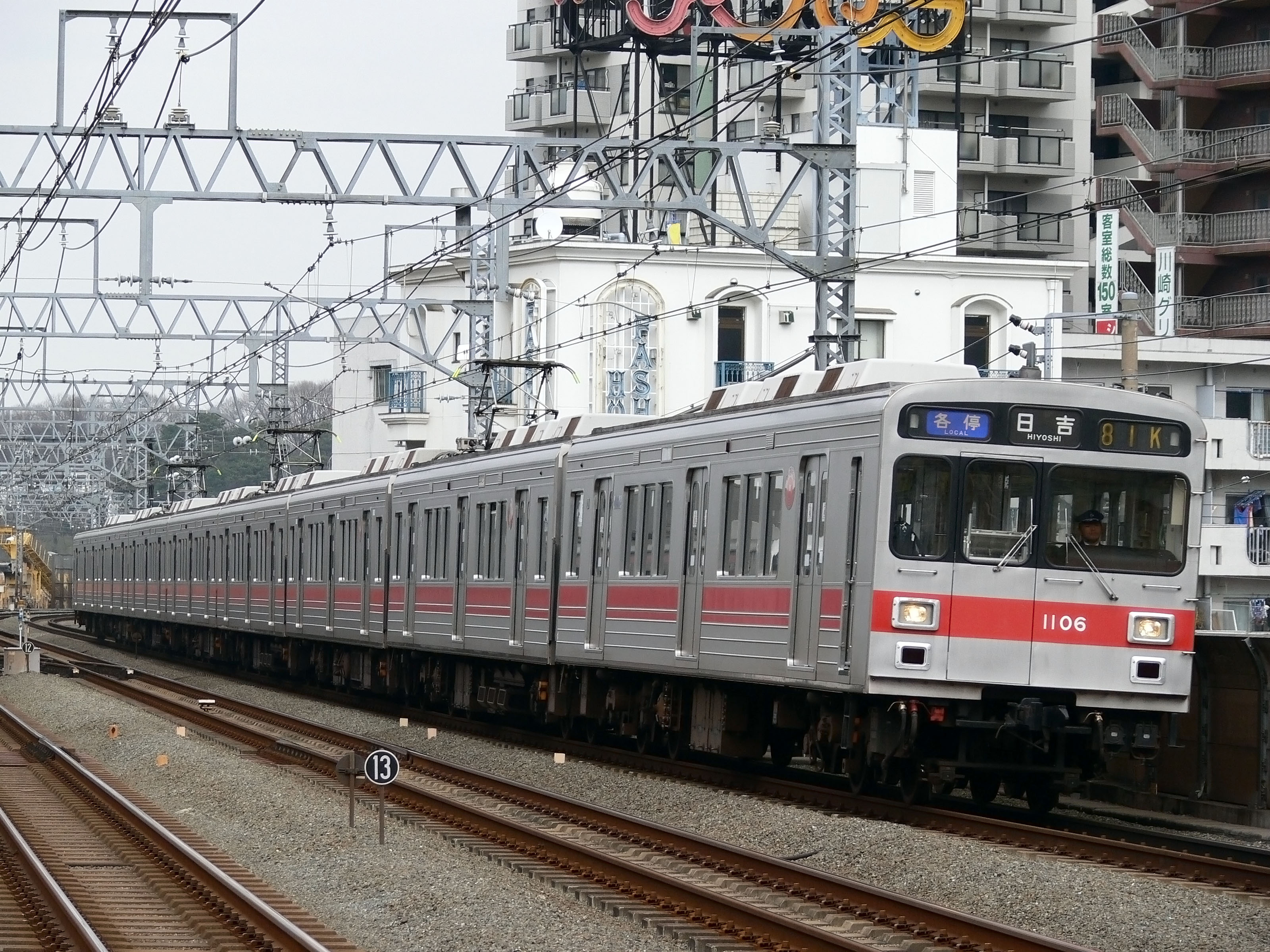
Tokyu 1000 series

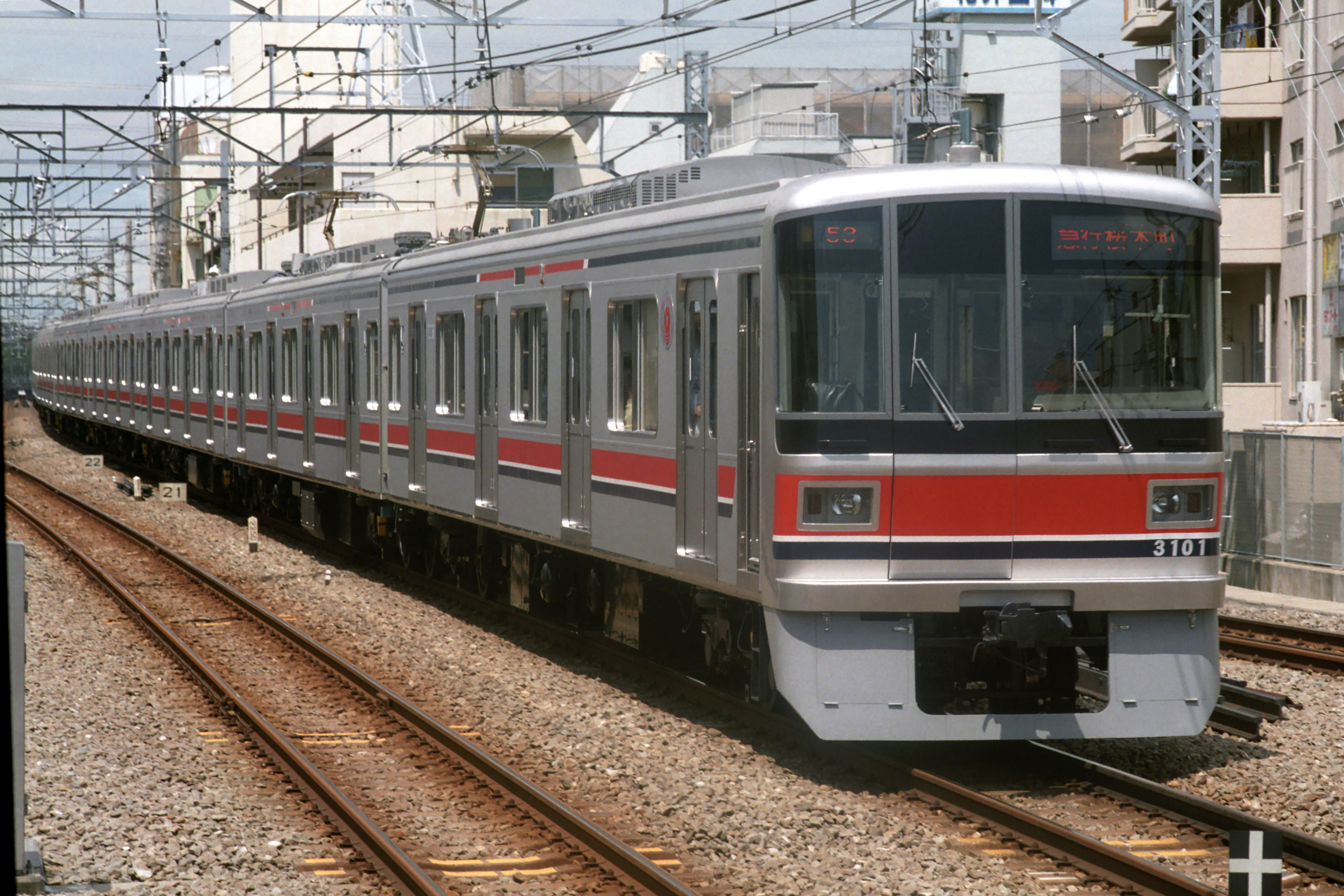
Tokyu 3000 series

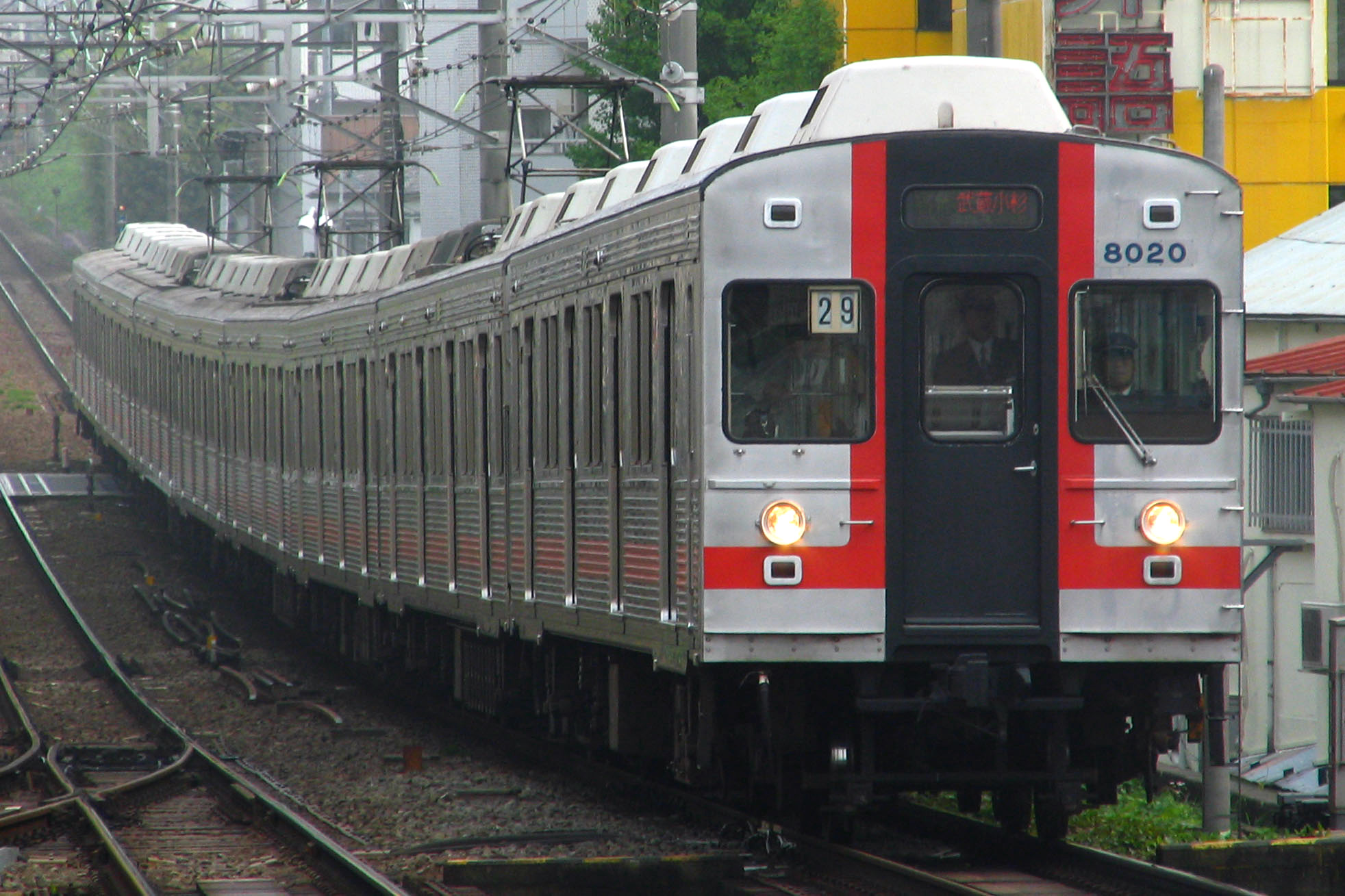
Tokyu 8000 series

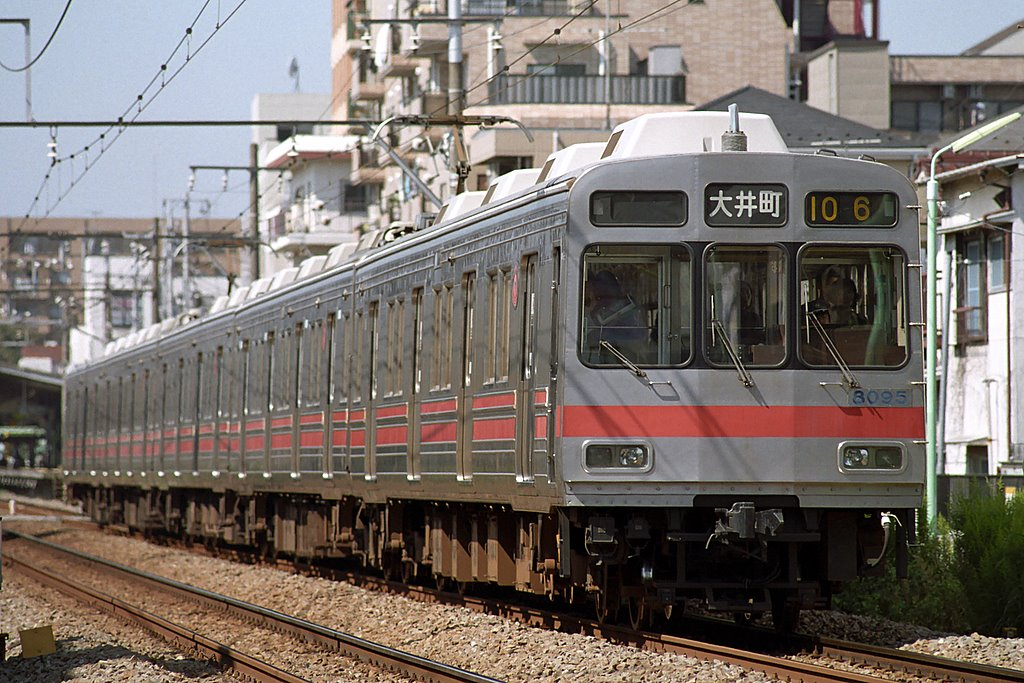
Tokyu 8090 series

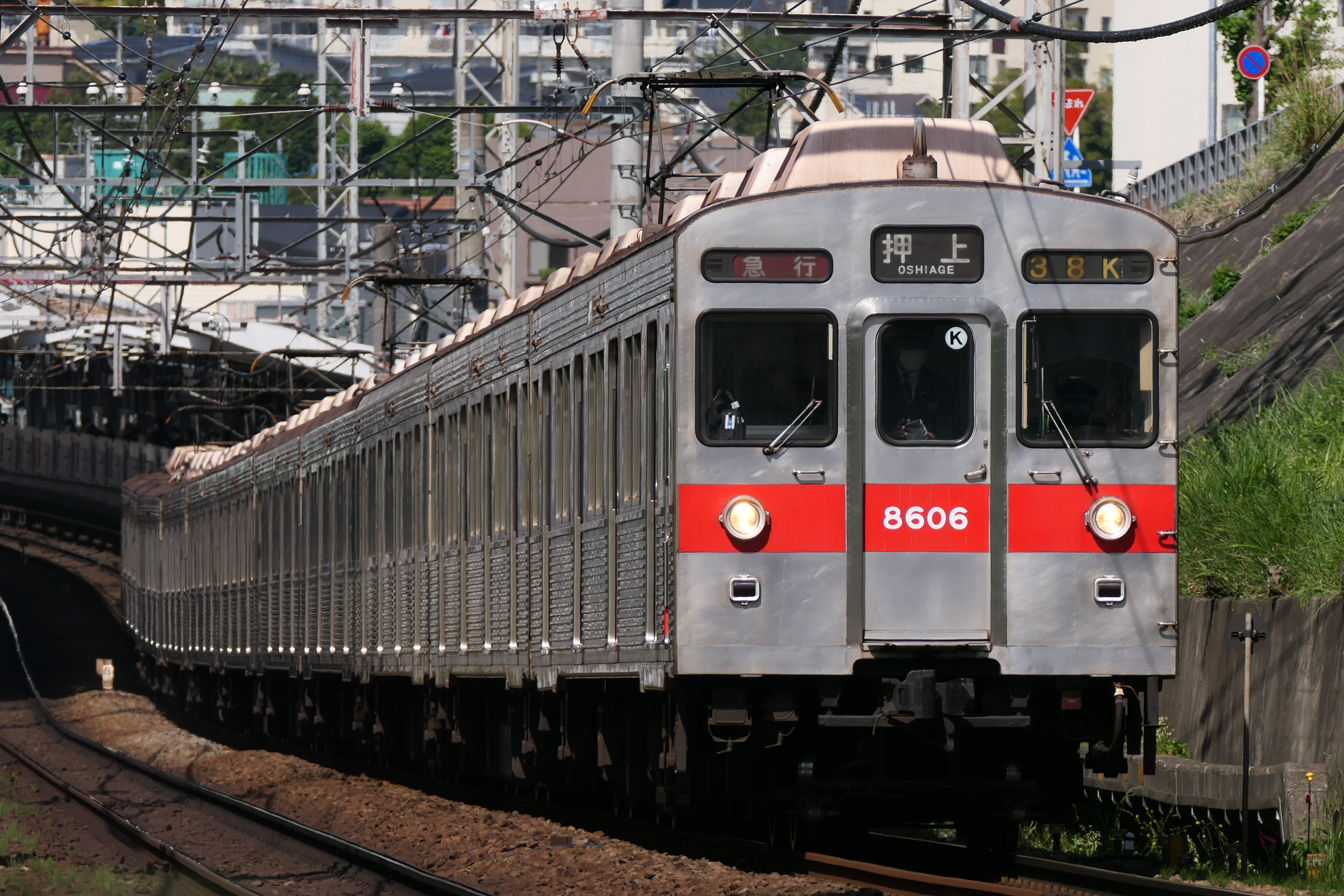
Tokyu 8500 series

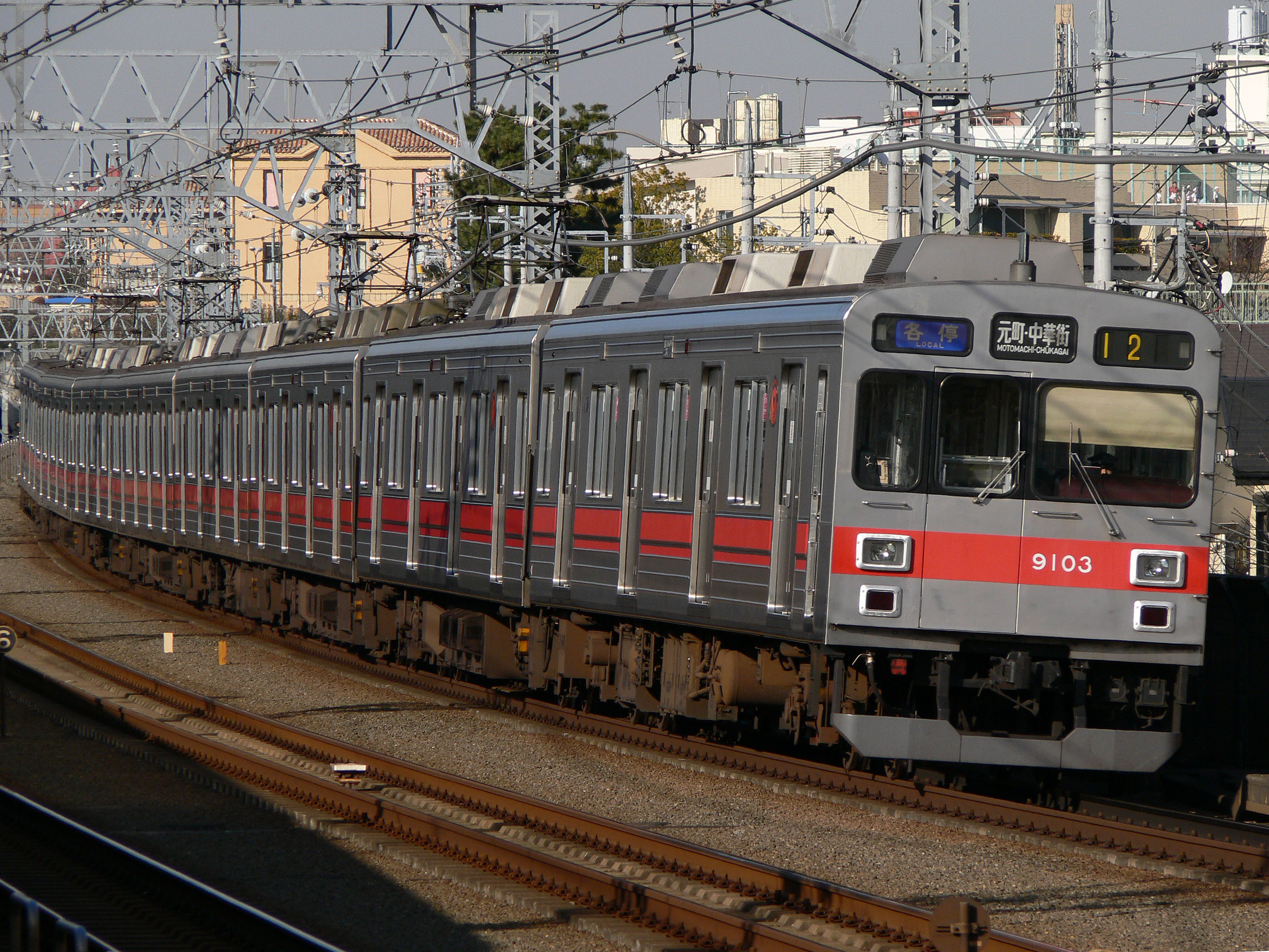
Tokyu 9000 series

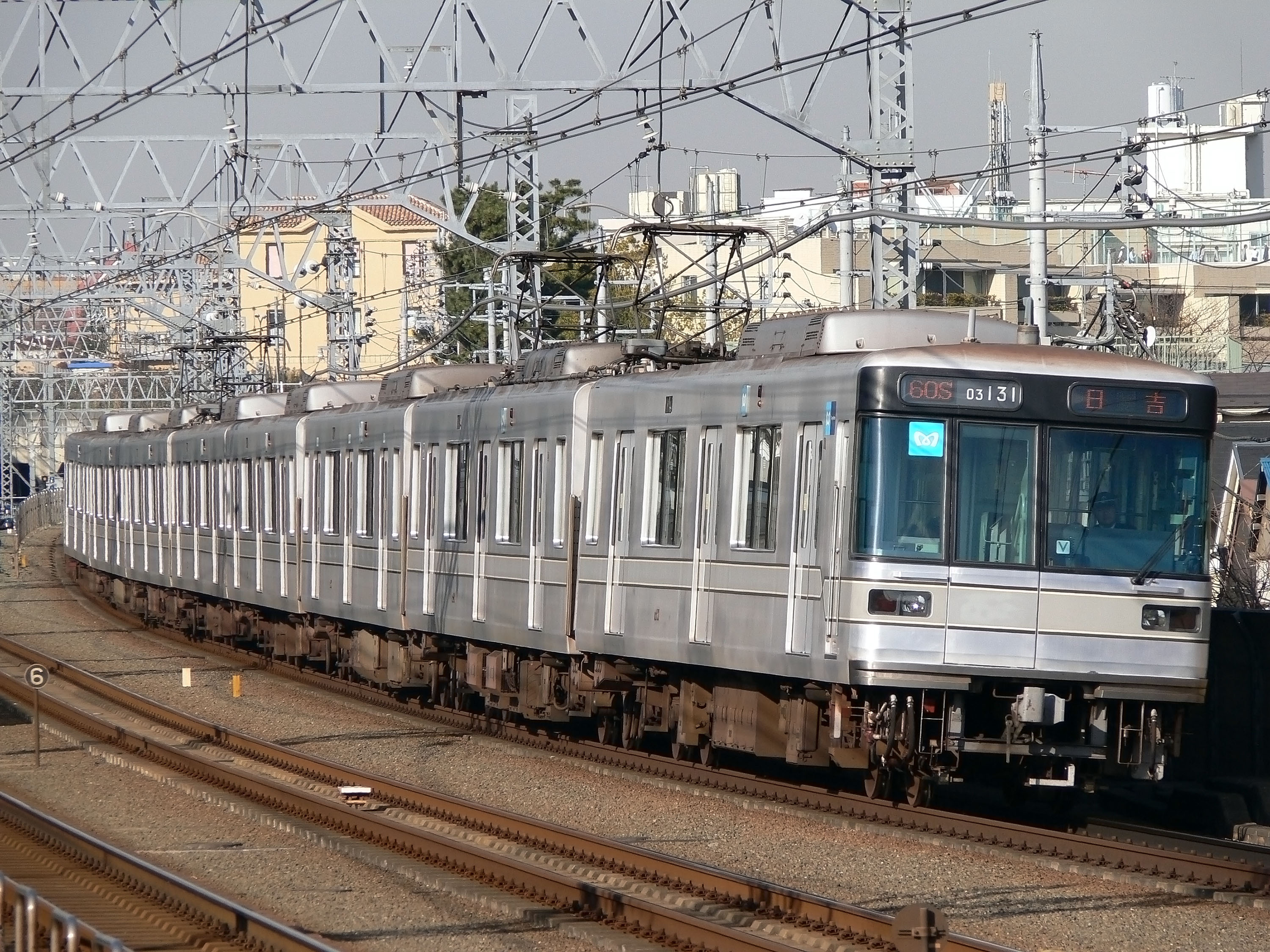
Tokyo Metro 03 series

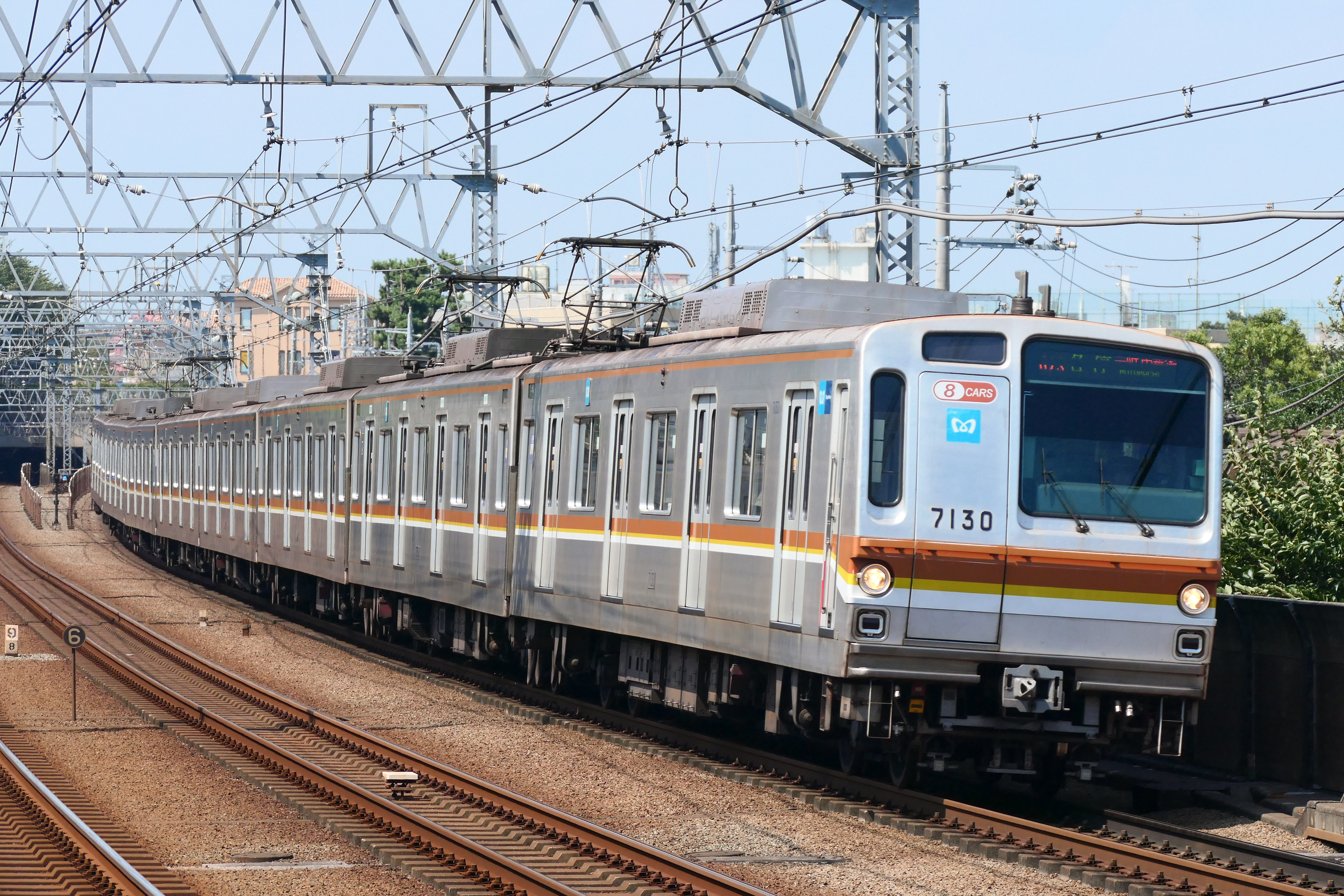
Tokyo Metro 7000 series

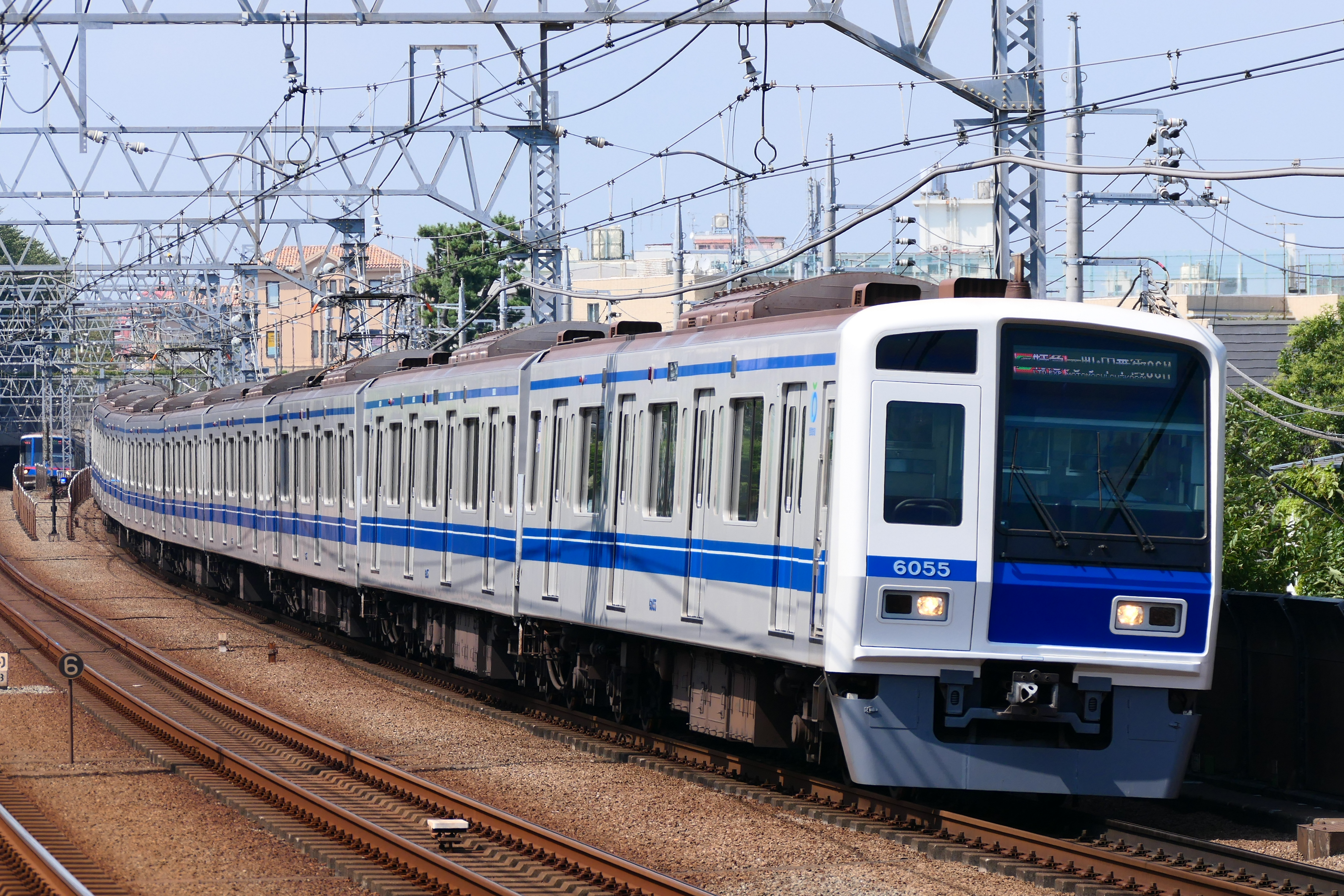
Seibu 6000 series

== History ==
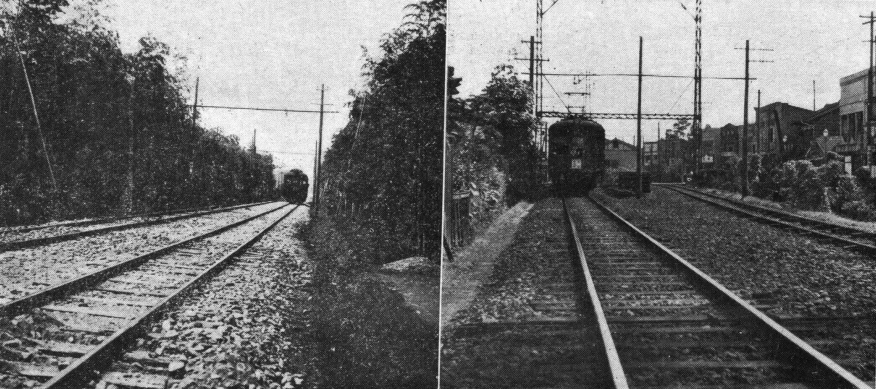
The Himonya Station area in 1927 (left) compared with the Aoyama Shihan Station area in the 1940s (right).

The first section of the line from Tamagawa to Kanagawa (separate from the present Kanagawa of Keikyu) opened on 14 February 1926. The line was extended incrementally until the entire length from Shibuya to Sakuragichō in Yokohama was opened on 31 March 1932. On 29 August 1964, through service to the Tokyo Metro Hibiya Line via Naka-Meguro Station was started.

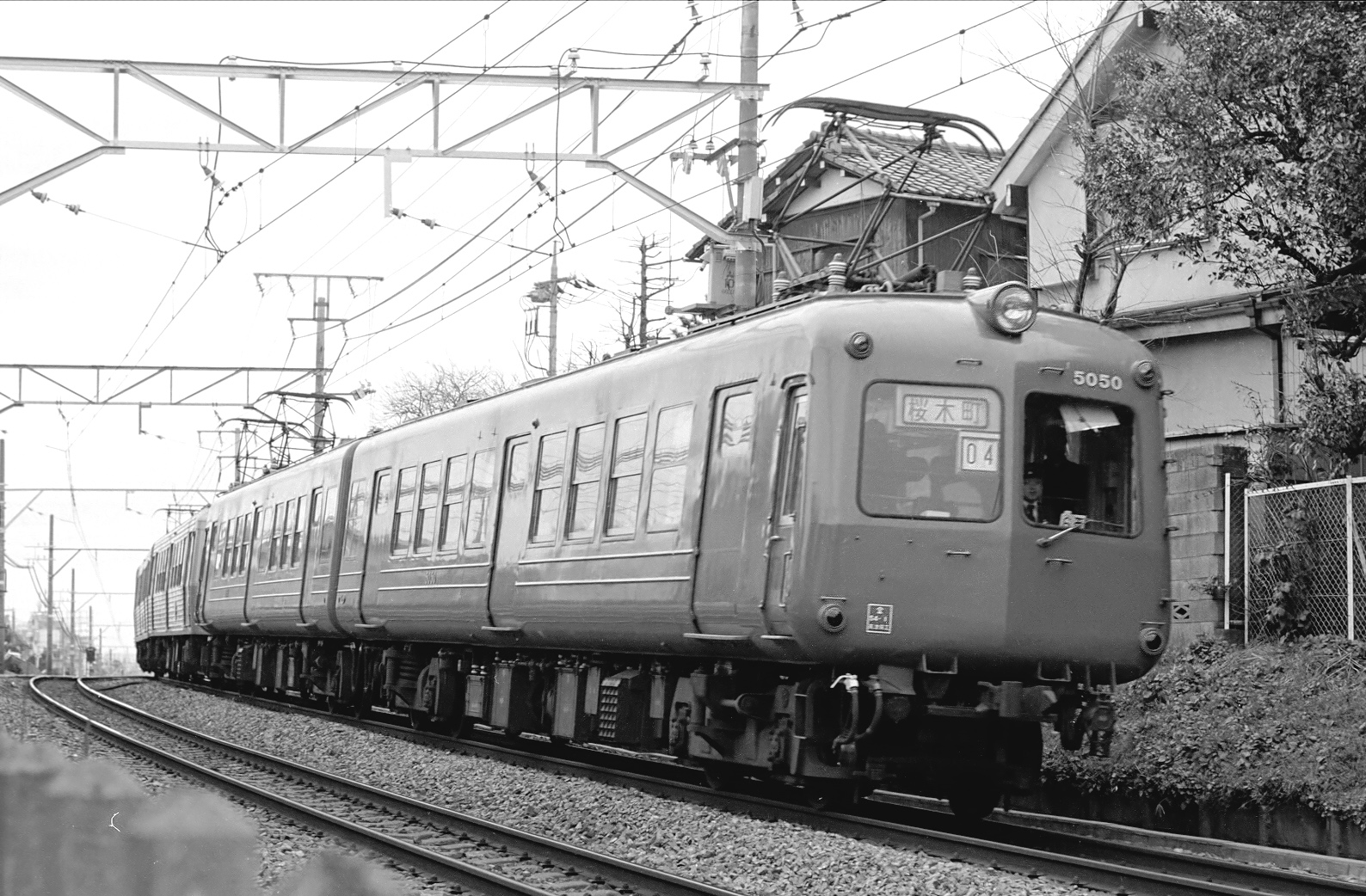
Tōyoko Line train in 1980

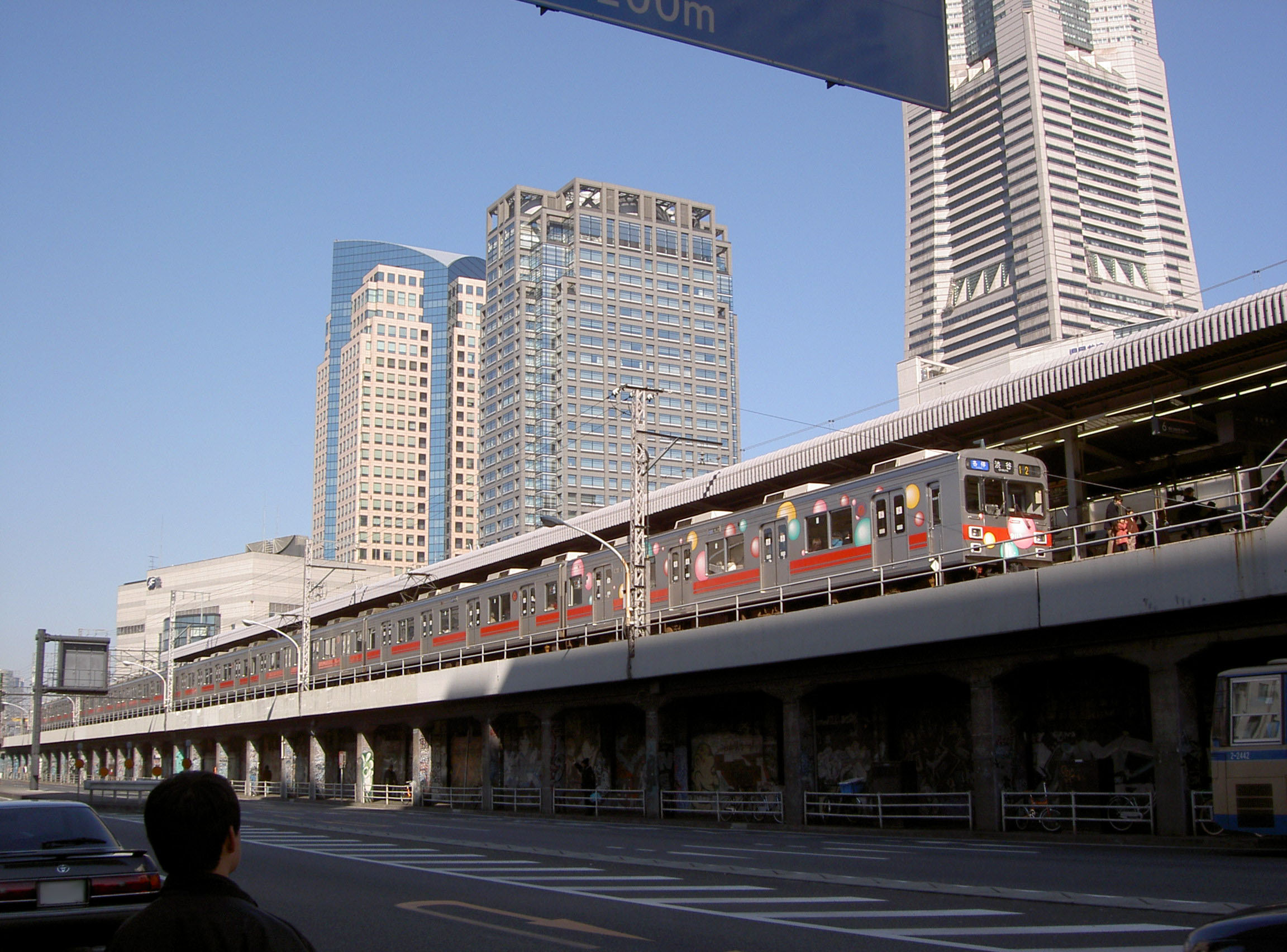
The former Sakuragicho Station platforms in January 2004

On 31 January 2004, the section of Yokohama to Sakuragichō was abandoned. From 1 February, Tokyu Toyoko Line trains started through service from Yokohama to the Minatomirai Line.

On 16 March 2013, the 1.4 km (0.87 mi) section between Shibuya to Daikan-yama was replaced with an underground connection to the Tokyo Metro Fukutoshin Line. The original ground-level terminal platforms were closed after the last service at 1 am that morning. Just four hours later, at 5 am, trains began calling at a new set of underground platforms adjacent to those previously served only by the Fukutoshin Line. During this time, 1,200 workers shifted the track alignment at Daikan-yama Station along a pre-built incline. Since that day, Tokyu and Yokohama Minatomirai Railway trains commenced through running onto the Fukutoshin Line and beyond. Tokyo Metro, Tobu, and Seibu also started operating their trains through to the Tōyoko and Minatomirai Lines. At the same time, through service on Hibiya Line ended.

In 2022, Tokyu announced the commencement of "Q-Seat" service on the Tōyoko Line for fiscal 2023. The Tōyoko Line will be the second Tokyu line to feature reserved seating services, the first being the Oimachi Line. Therefore, 5050 series 8-car set 5166 was reformed as 10-car set 4112 with two newly built “Q-Seat” cars. They feature the same livery used for the Oimachi Line, however were painted in red instead of orange. Set 4112 is currently undergoing testing and is being stored at Nagatsuta Depot. The cars started service on 24 October 2022 with "Q-Seat" services originally scheduled for February 2023. However as of August 2023, "Q-Seat" services are scheduled to begin service within the beginning of the month on 10 August.

Platform screen doors were scheduled to be installed at all station on the line by 2020. This work was finished on time before April 2020.

== Incidents and accidents ==
On 15 February 2014, two trains collided and derailed at Motosumiyoshi station resulting in nineteen injuries. Operations continuing at normal speed during heavy snow were seen as the likely cause.

On 13 March 2026 at 12:20 pm, due to an overhead line outage that occurred between Ōkurayama Station and Minatomirai Station on the Minatomirai Line, two trains in both directions were forced to stop. As a result, train services on both the Tōyoko Line and Minatomirai Line were suspended for 9.5 hours before resuming in both directions at around 9:50 p.m.. This incident caused the cancellation of 297 trains in both directions, affecting approximately 123,000 people.

== Future developments ==
- On 13 May 2022, Tokyu Corporation announced its decision to implement driver-only operation on the Tōyoko Line by fiscal 2023, at the earliest. The Tōyoko Line fleet is due to be modified accordingly.

== See also ==
- List of railway lines in Japan
