= Meguro (disambiguation) =

The Japanese name Meguro (目黒) may refer to:

- Meguro, a special ward of Tokyo
- Meguro, Meguro
- Meguro River
- Meguro Station
- Meguro Line
- Meguro motorcycles
- Meguro (surname)
