= Meguro, Meguro =

District of Meguro, Tokyo, Japan

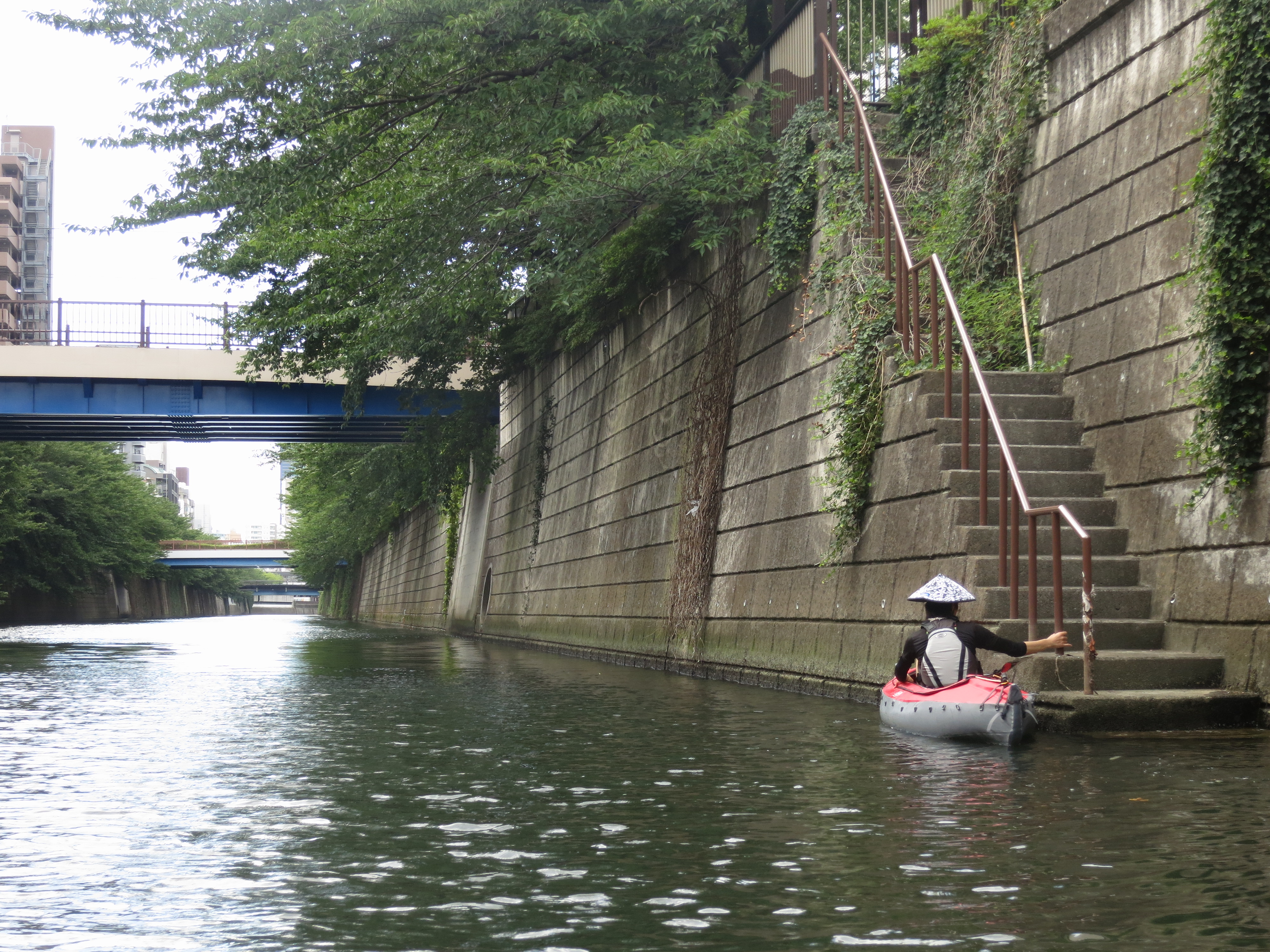
Meguro River in Meguro 1-chōme, -16 Jul. 2012 b

Meguro (目黒) is a district of Meguro, Tokyo, Japan, consisting of 1- to 4-chōme. It borders Nakameguro and Mita on the north, Kamiōsaki on the east, Shimomeguro on the south, and Nakachō on the west. Note that it is not this district but Kamiōsaki, Shinagawa that is home to JR Meguro Station.

Opened in 1987, the Meguro Museum of Art, Tokyo is a small museum located in this district.

== Education ==
Meguro City Board of Education operates public elementary and junior high schools.

All of Meguro 1-chome and parts of 2 and 3-chome are zoned to Dendo Elementary School (田道小学校). Meguro 4-chome is zoned to Aburamen Elementary School (油面小学校). Parts of Meguro 2 and 3-chome are zoned to Shimomeguro Elementary School (下目黒小学校). All of Meguro is zoned to Otori Junior High School (大鳥中学校).
