= Nakachō, Meguro, Tokyo =

Coordinates: 35.6327°N 139.6958°E

Nakachō (中町) is a residential district located in the northeastern portion of Meguro, Tokyo, consisting of 1-chōme and 2-chōme. As of January 1, 2008, it has a total population of 8,843.

Nakachō borders Gohongi and Yūtenji Station on the north, Nakameguro on the northeast, Meguro on the east, Shimomeguro on the south, and Chūōchō on the west.

== Education ==
Meguro City Board of Education operates public elementary and junior high schools.

Nakacho 1-chome and a portion of 2-chome are zoned to Aburamen Elementary School (油面小学校). Another part of 2-chome is zoned to Gohongi Elementary School (五本木小学校). Nakacho 1-chome is zoned to Otori Junior High School (大鳥中学校) while 2-chome is zoned to Meguro Central Junior High School (目黒中央中学校).
