= Kamiōsaki, Shinagawa, Tokyo =

Coordinates: 35°38′2″N 139°43′3″E

Kamiōsaki (上大崎) is a district of Shinagawa, Tokyo, Japan. The district is in the northern part of Shinagawa and borders Mita (Meguro-Mita) and Ebisuminami on the north, Shirokanedai on the east, Higashigotanda on the southeast, Nishigotanda on the southwest, and Meguro and Shimomeguro on the west.

Kamiōsaki is home to Meguro Station; therefore, commercial areas around the station are often recognized as a part of the broader Meguro area.

Otherwise, most of Kamiōsaki is a quiet upscale residential district, notably with its 2-chōme and 3-chōme called Chōjamaru (長者丸) and Hanabusayama (花房山), respectively.

== Education ==
Shinagawa City Board of Education operates public elementary and junior high schools.

1-3 chome are zoned to No. 3 Hino Elementary School (第三日野小学校) while 4-chome is zoned to No. 4 Hino Elementary School (第四日野小学校). All of it is zoned to Hino Gakuen (日野学園) for junior high school.
