= Meguro =

Meguro 目黒区
- Special ward
- Meguro City
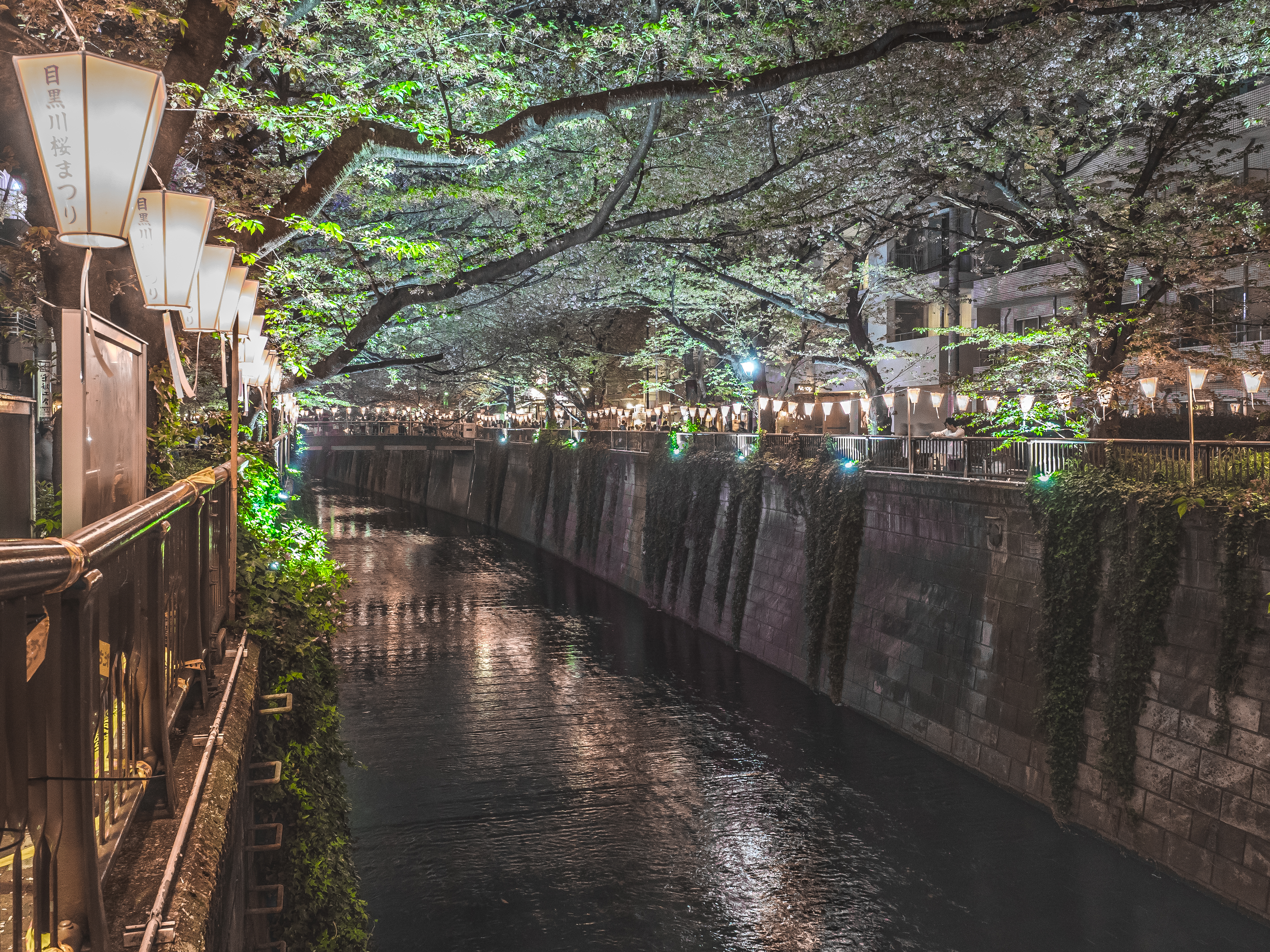
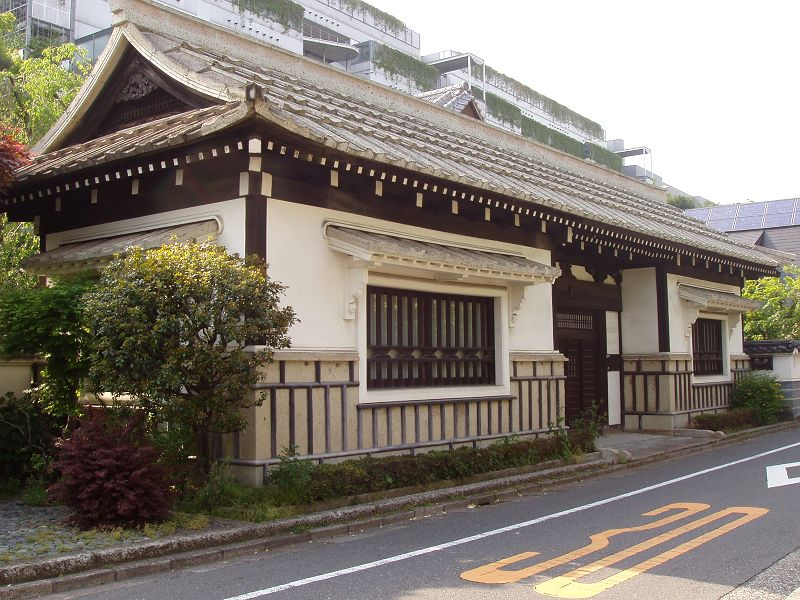
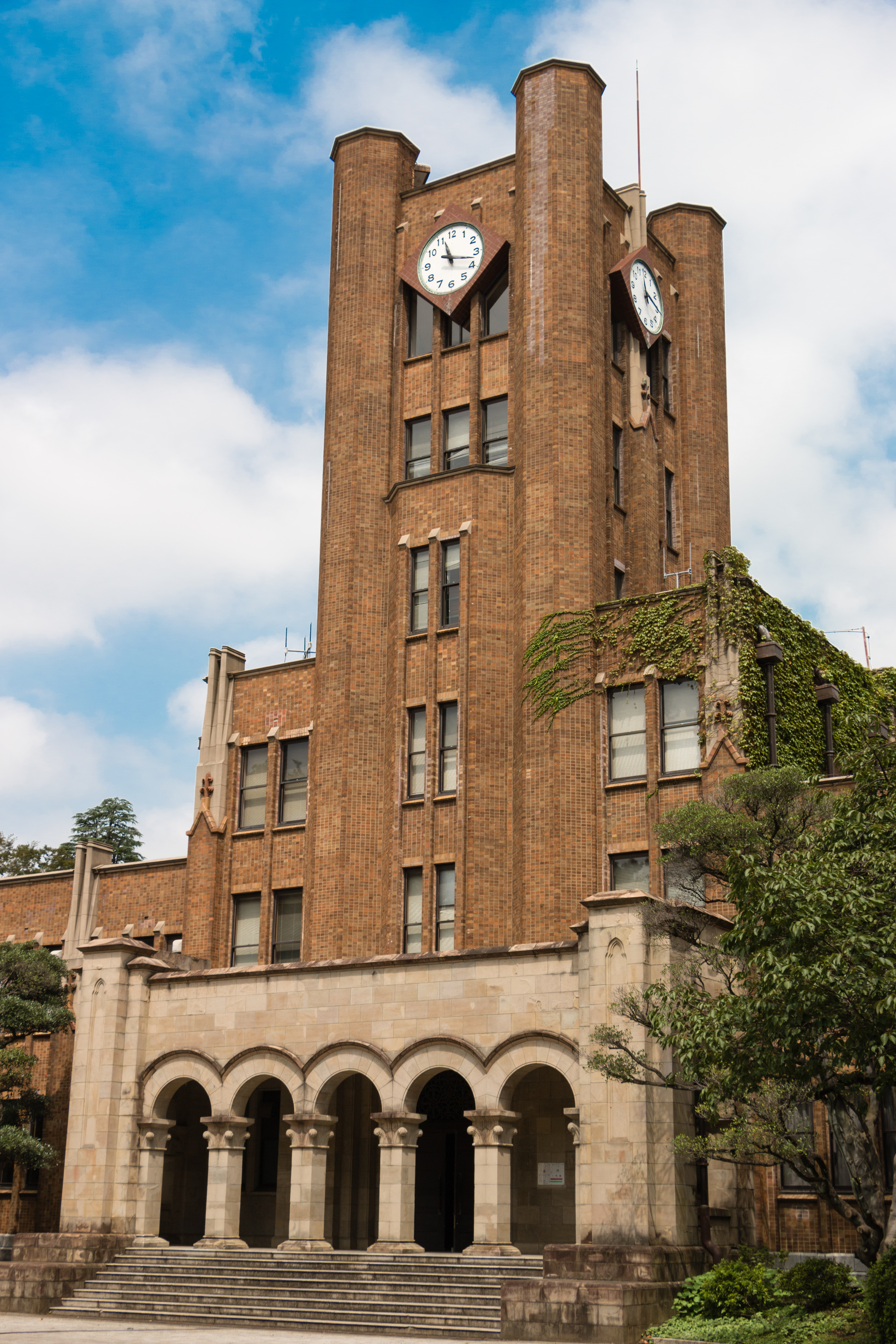
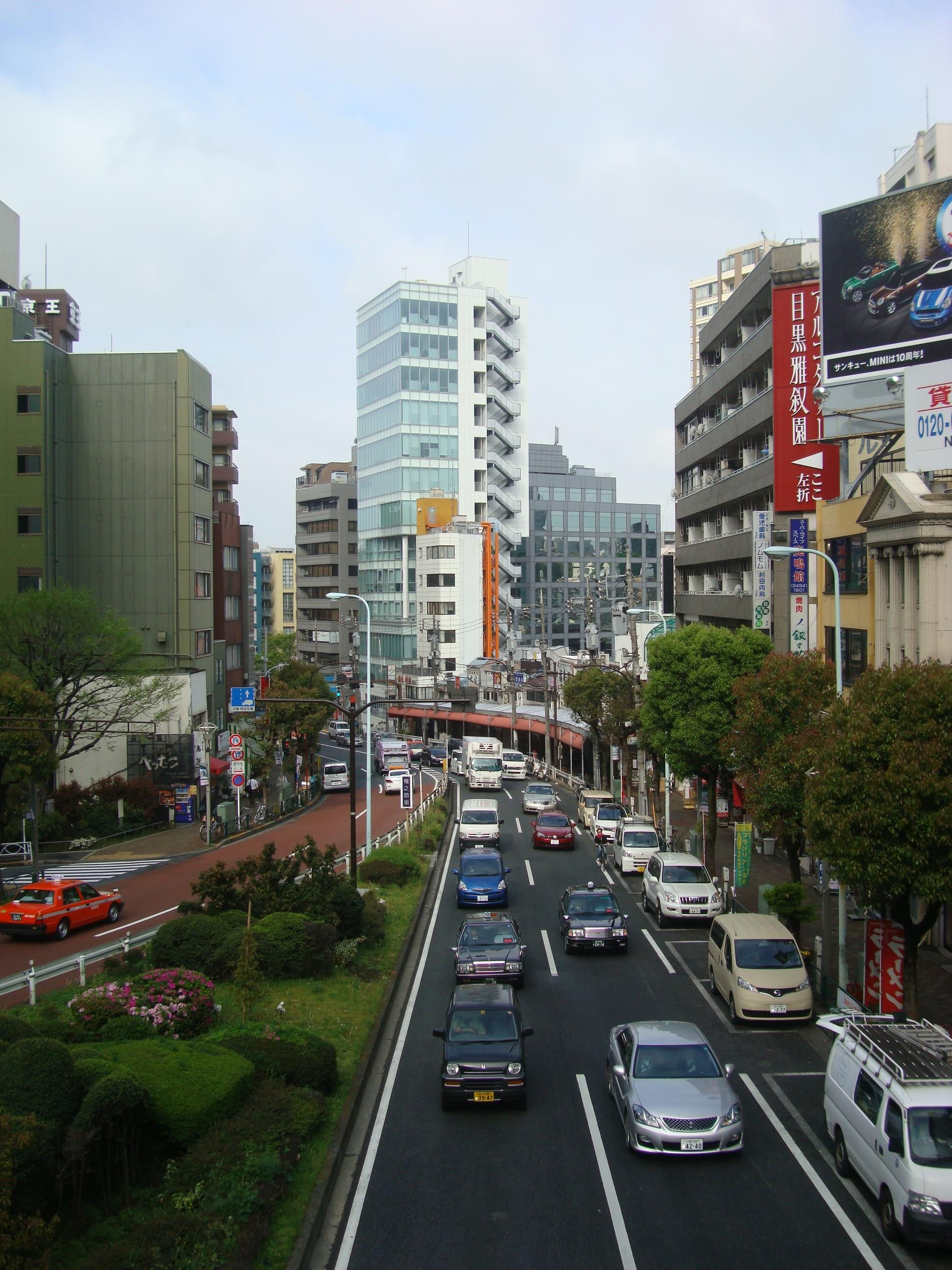
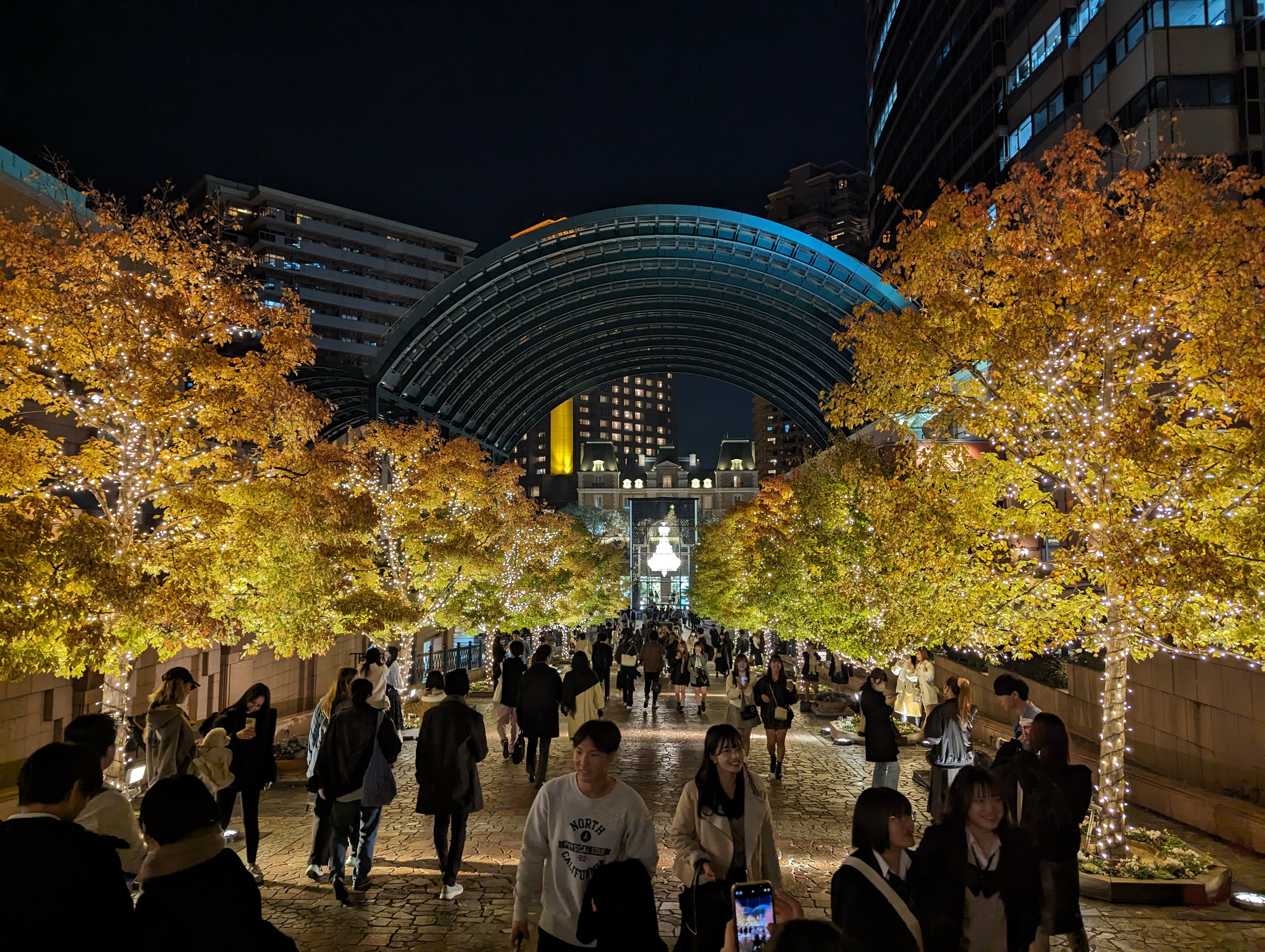
- Cherry trees along the Meguro River Japanese Folk Crafts Museum Komaba Campus, University of Tokyo Shimomeguro Yebisu Garden Place

- Flag Emblem

- Location of Meguro in Tokyo Metropolis

- Location in Japan
- Coordinates: 35°38′N 139°41′E
- Country: Japan
- Region: Kantō
- Prefecture: Tokyo Metropolis

Government
  - Mayor: Eiji Aoki

Area
  - Total: 14.67 km^{2} (5.66 sq mi)

Population (January 1, 2026)
  - Total: 282,607
  - Density: 19,637/km^{2} (50,860/sq mi)
- Time zone: UTC+09:00 (JST)
- Website: www.city.meguro.tokyo.jp
- Symbols
- Bird: Great tit
- Flower: Lespedeza
- Tree: Castanopsis

Meguro (目黒区, Meguro-ku; Japanese pronunciation: [mé̞.ɡɯ̈̀.ɾò̞, -ŋɯ̈̀.ɾò̞, mè̞.ɡɯ̈́.ɾó̞.kɯ̈̀, -ŋɯ̈́.ɾó̞-] (Note: The name of this ward is pronounced like this. The common noun for the Bonin white-eye is pronounced [mè̞.ɡɯ̈́.ɾó̞, -ŋɯ̈́-].)) is a special ward in the Tokyo Metropolis in Japan. The English translation of its Japanese self-designation is Meguro City. The ward was founded on March 15, 1947.

Meguro is predominantly residential in character, but is also home to light industry, corporate head offices, the Komaba campus of University of Tokyo as well as fifteen foreign embassies and consulates. Residential neighborhoods include Jiyugaoka, Kakinokizaka, and Nakameguro. As of May 1, 2015, the ward has an estimated population of 277,171 and a population density of 18,890 persons per km^{2}. The total area is 14.67 km^{2}.

Meguro is also used to refer to the area around Meguro Station, which is not located in Meguro ward, but in neighboring Shinagawa's Kamiōsaki district, 100 meters from the border with Meguro ward.

== History ==
The Higashiyama shell mound in the north of the ward contains remains from the Paleolithic, Jōmon, Yayoi, and Kofun periods.

The area now known as Meguro was formerly two towns, Meguro proper and Hibusuma, all parts of the former Ebara District of Musashi Province. The two were merged into a Meguro ward for Tokyo City in 1932 and since then the ward has remained with no alterations to its territory.

The name "Meguro", meaning "black eyes", derives from the Meguro Fudō (Black-eyed Fudō-myōō) of Ryūsenji. The Meguro Fudō was one of five Fudō-myōō statues placed at strategic points on the outskirts of Edo in the early seventeenth century by the abbot Tenkai, an advisor to Tokugawa Ieyasu, to provide protection for the new capital of the Tokugawa shogunate. Each statue had eyes of a different color. (Mejiro, a district in Toshima ward, is named for the white-eyed Fudō-myōō.)

== Demographics ==
Historical population
Year	Pop.	±%
1920	22,287	—
1930	108,208	+385.5%
1940	198,795	+83.7%
1945	121,333	−39.0%
1950	217,141	+79.0%
1960	293,763	+35.3%
1970	295,612	+0.6%
1980	278,455	−5.8%
1990	261,870	−6.0%
2000	249,017	−4.9%
2010	268,330	+7.8%
2020	288,088	+7.4%
Source: Censuses (Note: For years prior to 1930, figures cover the area of present-day Meguro-ku.)

== Geography ==
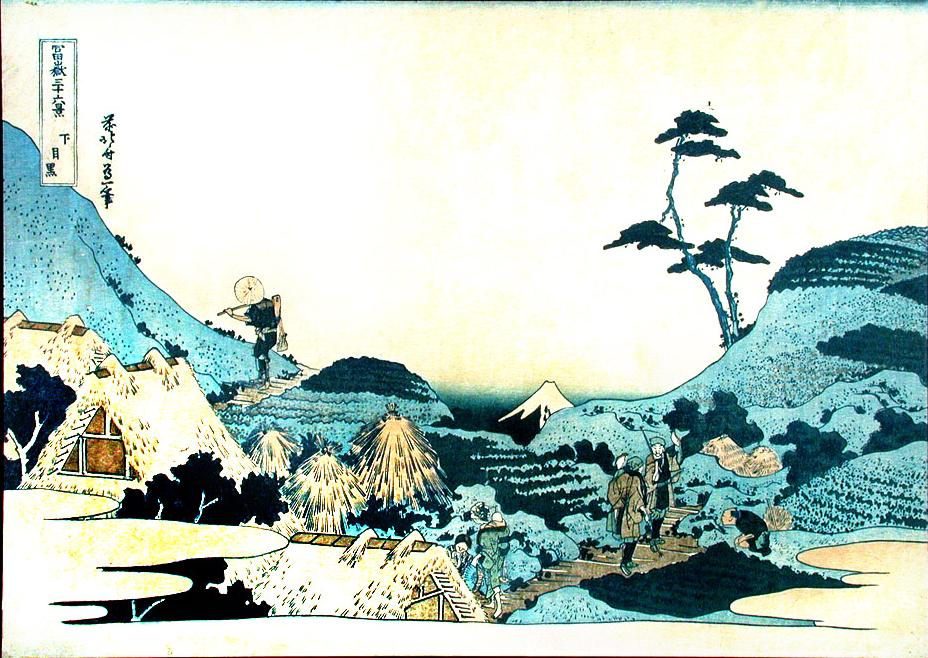
Hokusai ukiyo-e of a view of Mount Fuji from Shimomeguro

Four other special wards surround Meguro. They are Shibuya (to the northeast), Setagaya (to the west), Ōta (to the south), and Shinagawa (to the southeast).

=== Districts and neighborhoods ===
Hibusuma area

- Chūōchō
- Haramachi
- Higashigaoka
- Himonya
- Jiyūgaoka
- Kakinokizaka
- Megurohonchō
- Midorigaoka
- Minami
- Nakane
- Ōokayama
- Senzoku
- Tairamachi
- Takaban
- Yakumo
- Hirachō

Meguro area

- Aobadai
- Gohongi
- Higashiyama
- Kamimeguro
- Komaba
- Meguro
- Mita
- Nakachō
- Nakameguro
- Ōhashi
- Shimomeguro
- Yūtenji
- Sanda

== Politics and government ==
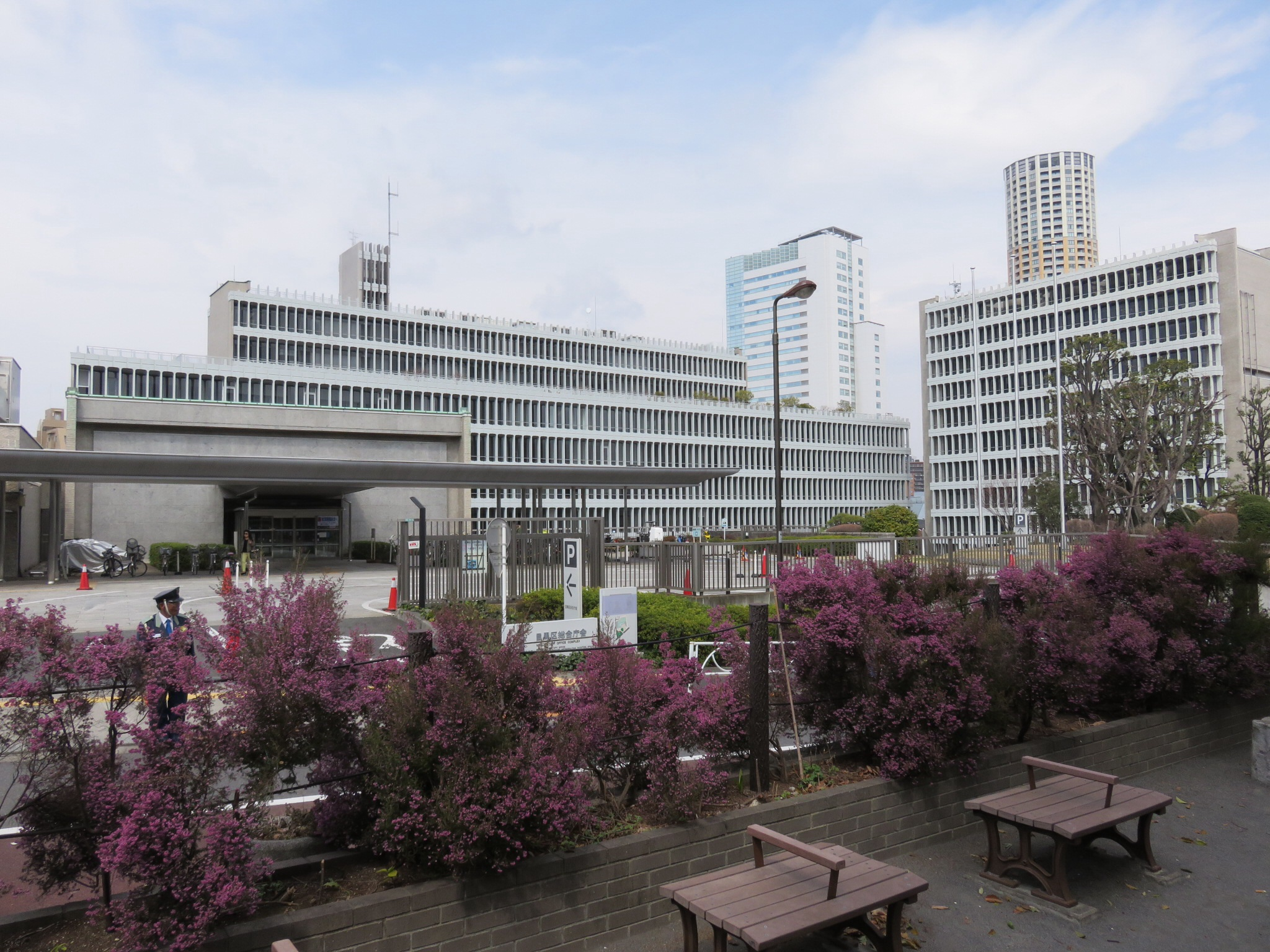
Meguro Ward Government Offices

Meguro ward government is led by the city assembly with 36 elected members with current terms from May 1, 2011, to April 30, 2015. The chairman of the council is Yasuhiro Onose of the Liberal Democratic Party. The mayor is Eiji Aoki, an independent. His 6th term lasts until April 24, 2028.

=== Elections ===
- 2007 Meguro local election
- 2008 Meguro mayoral election

== Sightseeing and local landmarks ==
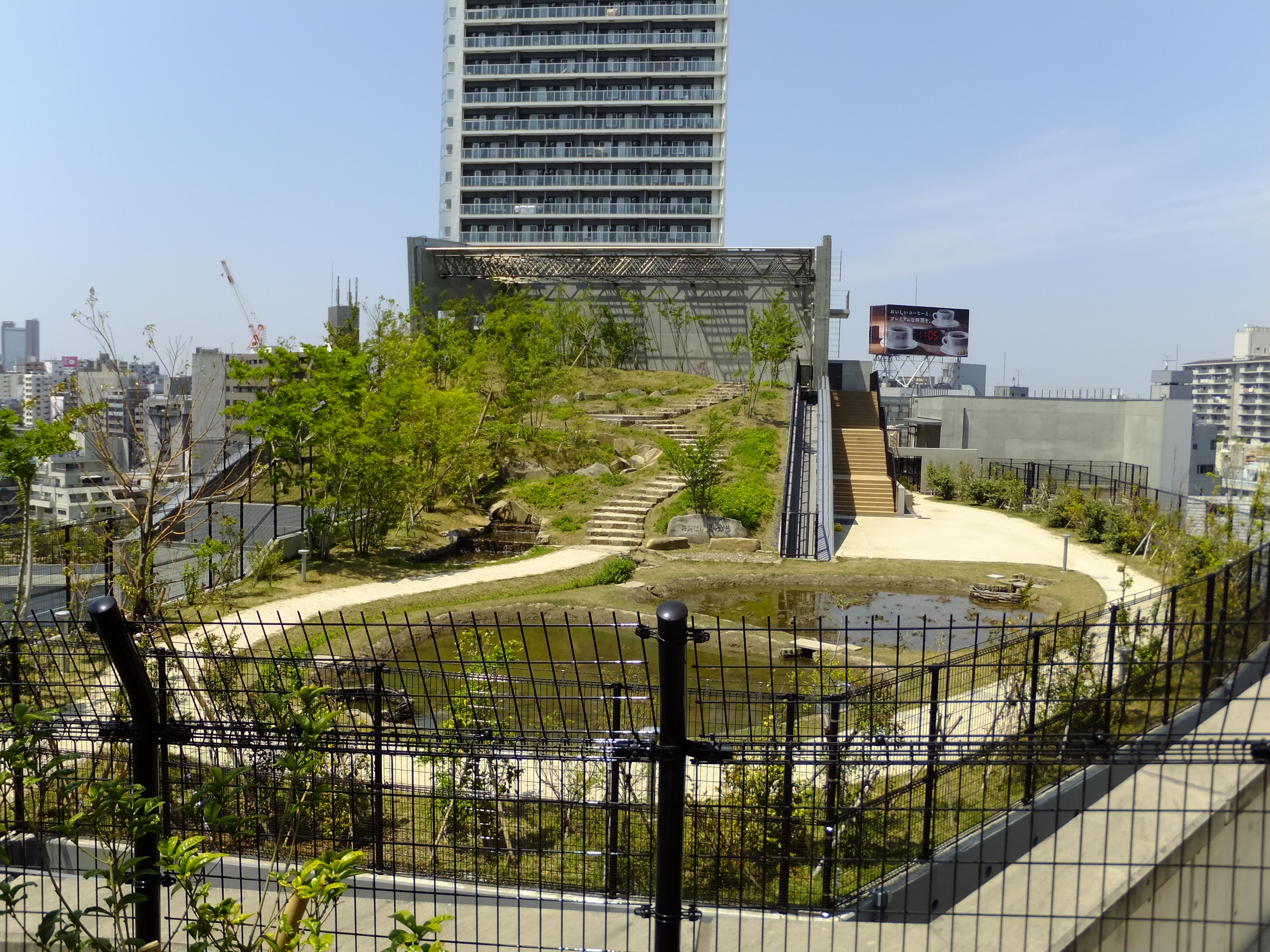
Meguro Sky Garden

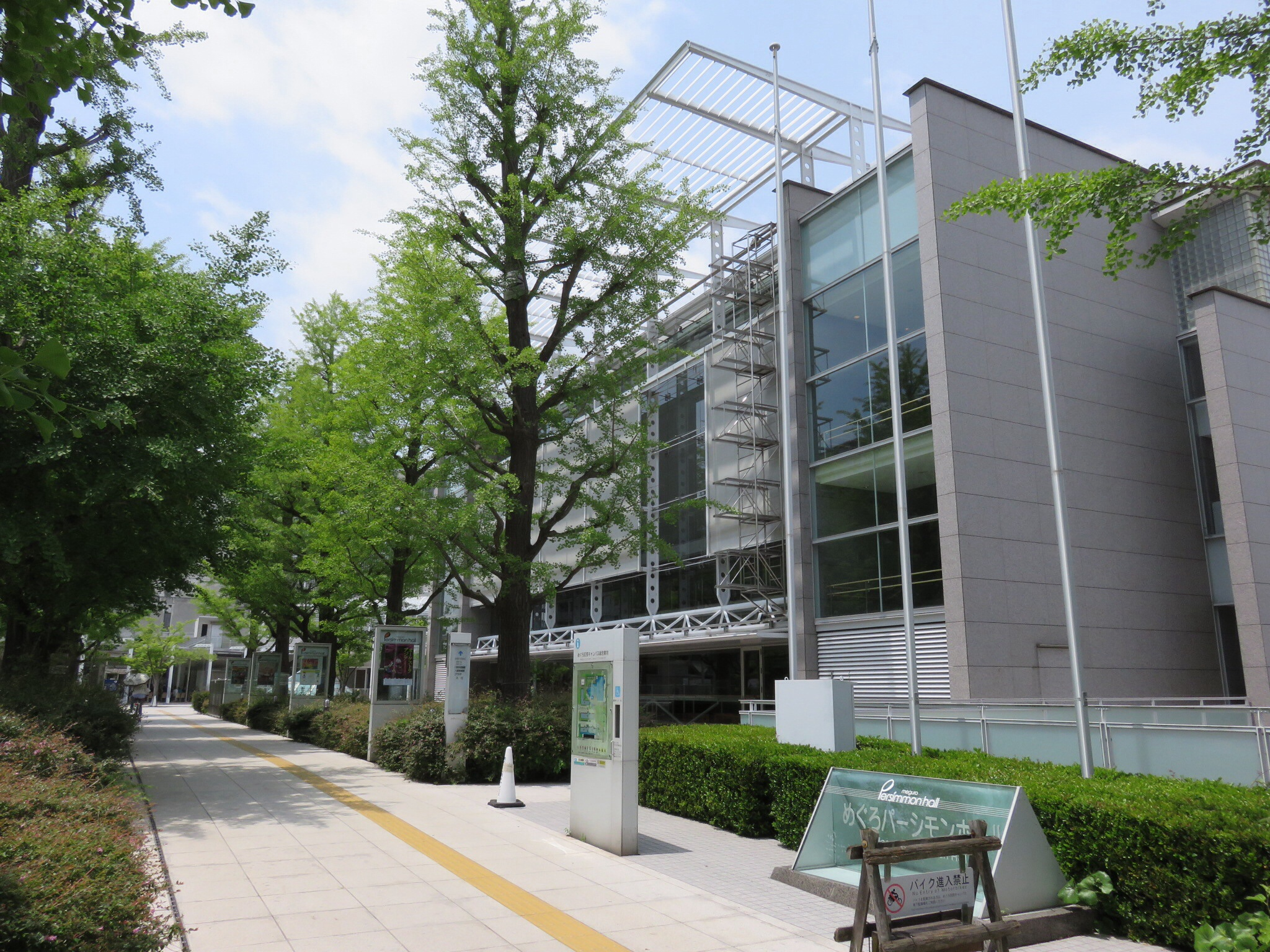
Persimmon Hall, Meguro

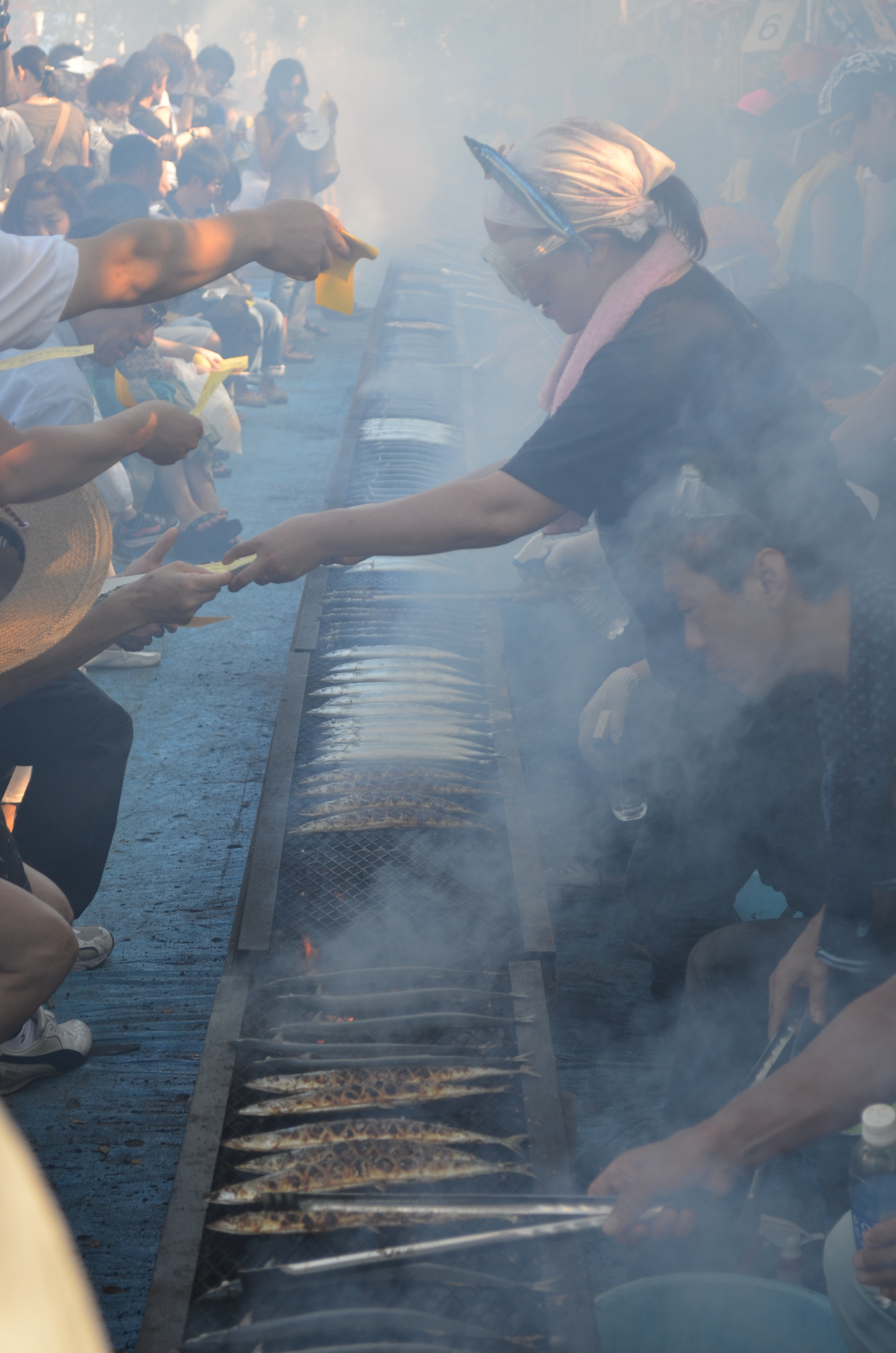
Grilled Pacific saury at the Meguro Autumn Sanma Festival

=== Green spaces ===
- Meguro River
- Komaba Park, Komaba
- Komabano Park, Komaba
- Komazawa Olympic Park
- Rinshi-no-mori Park
- Meguro Sky Garden, Ohashi Linear roof garden park spiraling 35 meters above street level covering the junction of two major expressways.
- Saigoyama Park, Aobadai
- Sugekari Park, Aobadai
- Nakameguro Park and Nature Center
- Himonya Park, Himonya

=== Cultural institutions ===
- Tokyo Metropolitan Museum of Photography
- Meguro Museum of Art, Tokyo
- Meguro Persimmon Hall, concert and performance arts venue
- Meguro Parasitological Museum
- Japanese Folk Crafts Museum
- Chosenin Temple Contemporary Sculpture Museum
- Meguro Gajoen, a landmark historic hotel

=== Religious institutions ===
- Himonya Catholic Church
- St. Michael's Catholic Church (German Language)
- Himonya Hachiman Shrine
- Ōtori Shrine
- Ryūsenji (Meguro Fudo temple)
- Yūten-ji Temple
- St. Paul's Church, Gohongi (Anglican Church in Japan)
- Masjid Indonesia Tokyo
- Gohyaku Rakanji Temple

== Transportation ==
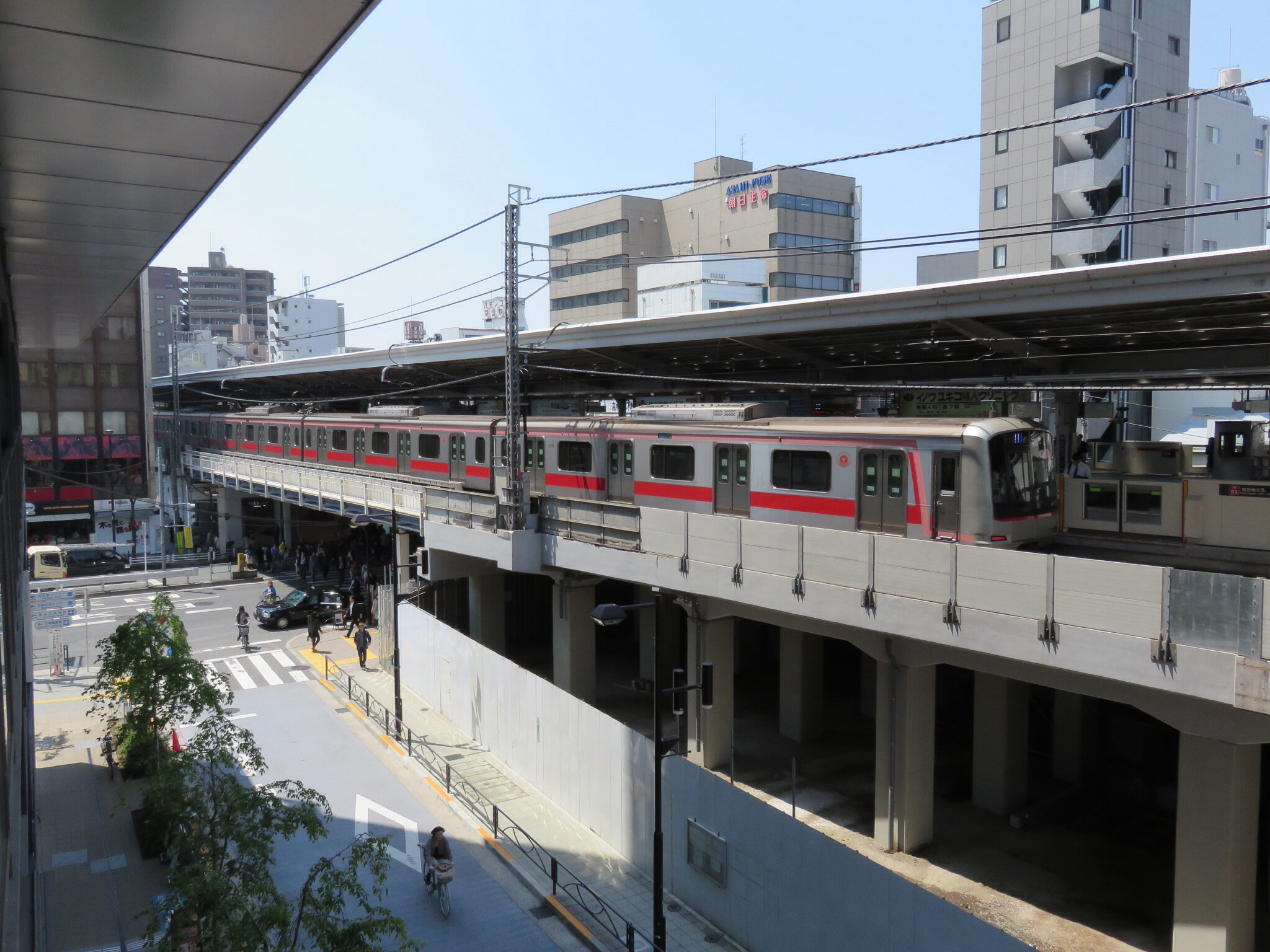
Naka-Meguro Station

=== Rail ===
- Tokyu Corporation
  - Tōyoko Line: Nakameguro - Yūtenji - Gakugei-daigaku - Toritsu-daigaku - Jiyūgaoka
  - Ōimachi Line: Jiyugaoka - Midorigaoka - Ōokayama
  - Meguro Line: Ōokayama - Senzoku
  - Den-en-toshi Line: Ikejiri-Ōhashi
- Keio Corporation Keiō Inokashira Line: Komaba-Todaimae
- Note: Meguro Station (JR East, Tokyu Meguro Line, Tokyo Metro Namboku Line, Toei Mita Line) is in Shinagawa, not Meguro.

=== Highways ===
- Route 3 (Shuto Expressway) Shibuya radial route (Tanimachi JCT – Yoga)
- Central Circular Route C2. Completed in 2016 this deep level subterranean expressway connect the Yamate Tunnel as far as the Bayshore Route in Shinagawa

== Education ==
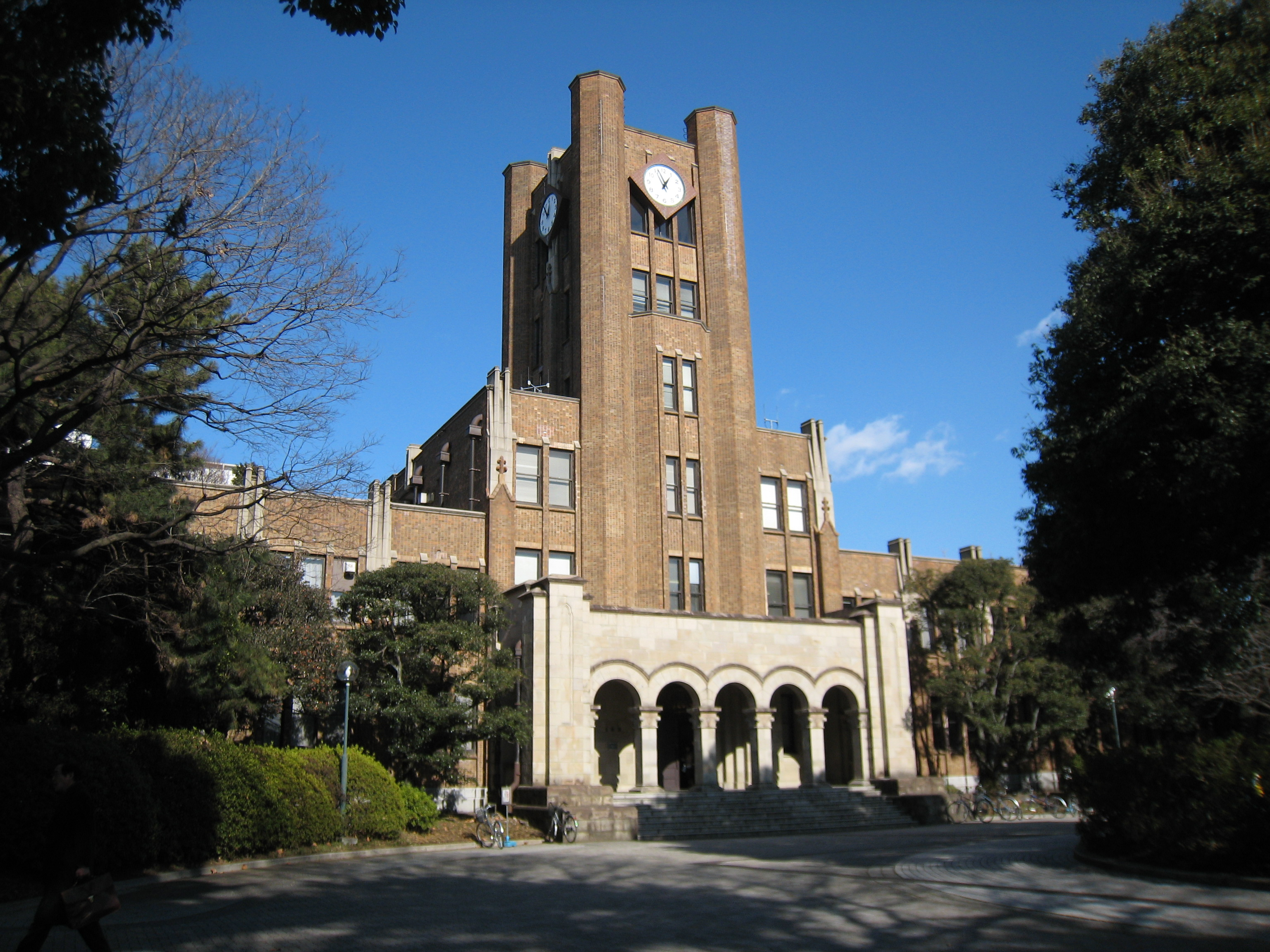
University of Tokyo, Komaba Campus

=== Colleges and universities ===
- University of Tokyo Komaba Campus
- Institute of Science Tokyo
- Note: Tokyo Gakugei University and Tokyo Metropolitan University were formerly in Meguro.
- Tokyo College of Music

=== Public schools ===
Metropolitan high schools are operated by the Tokyo Metropolitan Government Board of Education.

- Kokusai High School (Kokusai means "International" in Japanese)
- Komaba High School
- Meguro High School
- Geijutsu High School (Closed in 2012)

In addition the metropolis operates a consolidated junior and senior high school in Meguro called Ōshūkan Secondary School.

Municipal elementary and junior high schools are operated by the Meguro City Board of Education.

Municipal junior high schools:

- Meguro 1st Junior High School (第一中学校)
- Meguro 7th Junior High School (第七中学校)
- Meguro 9th Junior High School (第九中学校)
- Meguro 10th Junior High School (第十中学校)
- Higashiyama Junior High School (東山中学校)
- Meguro Chuo Junior High School (目黒中央中学校)
- Meguro Nishi Junior High School (目黒西中学校)
- Otori Junior High School (大鳥中学校)

Municipal elementary schools:

- Aburamen Elementary School (油面小学校)
- Dendo Elementary School (田道小学校)
- Fudo Elementary School (不動小学校)
- Gekkohara Elementary School (月光原小学校)
- Gohongi Elementary School (五本木小学校)
- Haramachi Elementary School (原町小学校)
- Higashine Elementary School (東根小学校)
- Higashiyama Elementary School (東山小学校)
- Ishibumi Elementary School (碑小学校)
- Kamimeguro Elementary School (上目黒小学校)
- Karasumori Elementary School (烏森小学校)
- Komaba Elementary School (駒場小学校)
- Midorigaoka Elementary School (緑ケ丘小学校)
- Miyamae Elementary School (宮前小学校)
- Mukaihara Elementary School (向原小学校)
- Naka Meguro Elementary School (中目黒小学校)
- Nakane Elementary School (中根小学校)
- Ookayama Elementary School (大岡山小学校)
- Shimomeguro Elementary School (下目黒小学校)
- Sugekari Elementary School (菅刈小学校)
- Takaban Elementary School (鷹番小学校)
- Yakumo Elementary School (八雲小学校)

=== International schools ===
- Aoba-Japan International School
- Tokyo Indonesian School

== Economy ==
=== Company headquarters ===
- Amazon Japan head office
- Books Kinokuniya
- Don Quijote discount store chain head office
- LDH (Headquarters for EXILE & other Dance Units)
- Makino
- New Japan Pro-Wrestling head office
- Ribera Steakhouse
- Stanley Electric
- TopTour Corporation
- Monolith Soft head office
- Unilever Japan, head office
- Walt Disney Japan, head office

== International relations ==
=== Friendship cities ===
- Dongcheng District, Beijing, People's Republic of China (since 1991)
- (South Korea) Jungnang District, Seoul, Republic of Korea (since 2013)

=== Diplomatic missions in Meguro ===
Embassy of Poland at Mita

- Embassy of the People's Democratic Republic of Algeria (at Higashigaoka)
- Embassy of the Republic of Azerbaijan (at Mita)
- Embassy of the Arab Republic of Egypt (at Aobadai)
- (Gabon) Embassy of the Gabonese Republic (at Higashigaoka)
- Embassy of the Republic of Kenya (at Yakumo)
- Embassy of the Islamic Republic of Mauritania (at Gohongi)
- Embassy of the Federated States of Micronesia (at Meguro)
- Embassy of Nepal (at Shimomeguro)
- Embassy of the Independent State of Papua New Guinea (at Shimomeguro)
- Embassy of the Republic of Poland (at Mita)
- Embassy of the Republic of Senegal (at Aobadai)
- Embassy of the Republic of the Sudan (at Yakumo)
- (Thailand) Royal Thai Embassy Military Attaché Office (at Shimomeguro)
- (Togo) Embassy of the Togolese Republic (at Yakumo)

== Notable people from Meguro ==
- Yumiko Fujita, actress
- Waka Inoue, model, actress
- Risa Tsubaki, voice actress
- Toru Iwatani, arcade game designer, most notable for Pac-Man and Pole Position
- Shigeru Izumiya, folk singer, entertainer (born in Aomori, Aomori, but raised in Meguro)
- Masako, Empress of Japan (born in Toranomon, but raised in Meguro)
- Yukio Sakaguchi, mixed martial arts fighter and professional wrestler
- Kazuo Tokumitsu, television presenter
- Renhō, politician

=== Notable residents ===
- Takuya Kimura, singer and actor in male idol group SMAP
- Shizuka Kudo, popular singer and wife of Takuya Kimura (Originally from Hamura, Tokyo)
- Keisuke Kuwata, singer with Southern All Stars (Originally from Chigasaki, Kanagawa)
- Nobuyo Ōyama, voices the anime character Doraemon (Originally from Shibuya, Tokyo)
- Miyu Uehara, gravure idol, found dead in her Meguro apartment (Originally from Tanegashima, Kagoshima)
- Halca & Yucali of the hip-hop duo Halcali
- Shori Sato, singer and actor in male idol group Sexy Zone
- Suehiro Maruo, Manga artist, one of the best-known exponents of Ero Guro (Originally from Nagasaki, Nagasaki)
