= 2007 Meguro local election =

Local election in Tokyo, Japan

Meguro, Tokyo, held a local election for the city assembly on April 15, 2007.

== Results ==
Summary of the April 15, 2007 Meguro City Assembly election results
Parties	Votes	%	Seats
Liberal Democratic Party of Japan (自由民主党, Jiyū Minshutō)	23,910.873		15
Democratic Party of Japan (民主党, Minshutō)	11,995,438		7
Japanese Communist Party (日本共産党, Nihon Kyōsan-tō)	8,597		5
New Komeito party (公明党, Kōmeitō)	9,671.649		3
目黒･生活者ネットワーク	1,695		1
Social Democratic Party (社民党 Shamin-tō)	1,525.476		1
Independents	10,876		4
Total (turnout 38.49%)	81,168	100.00	36
Source:JanJan
