= Mita, Meguro, Tokyo =

Town located in Meguro-ku, Tokyo

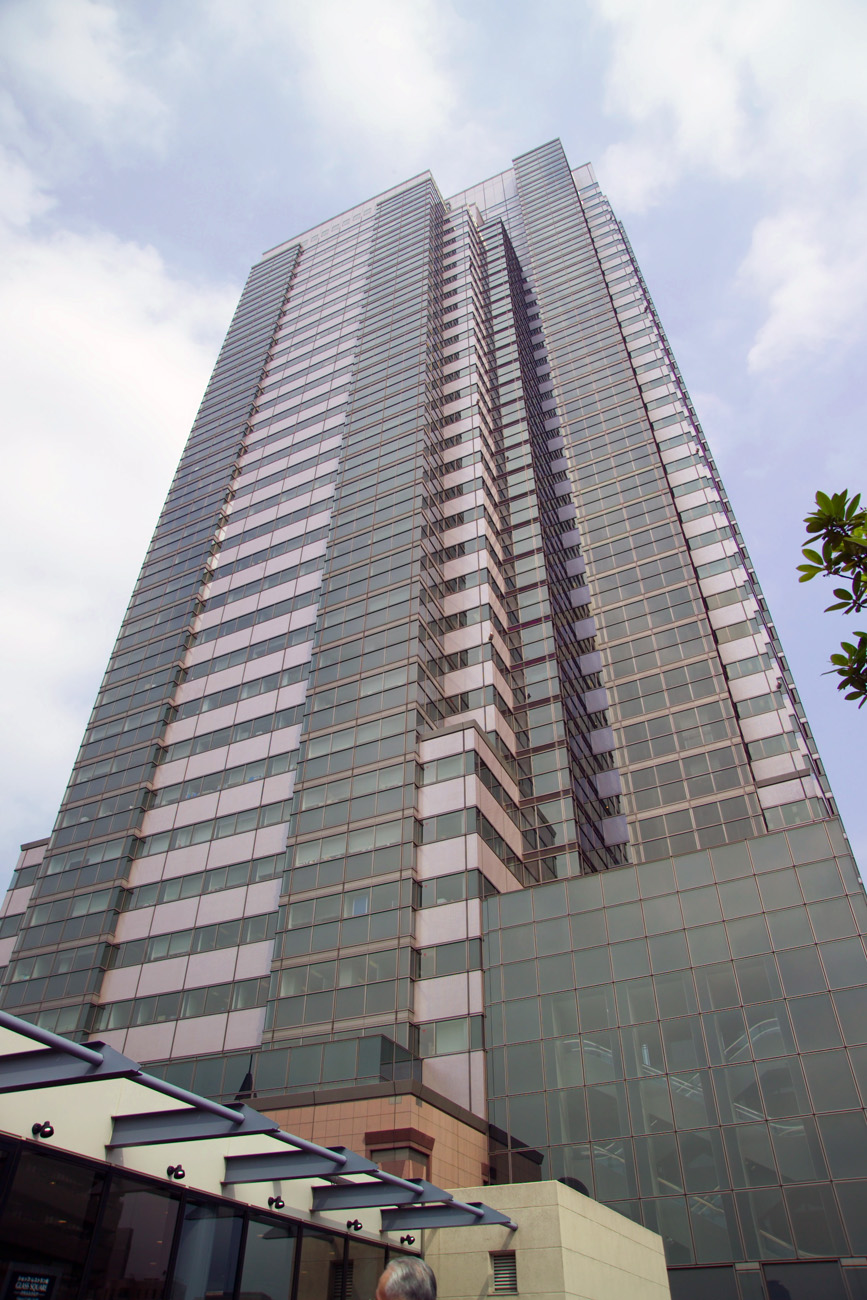
Yebisu Garden Place Tower

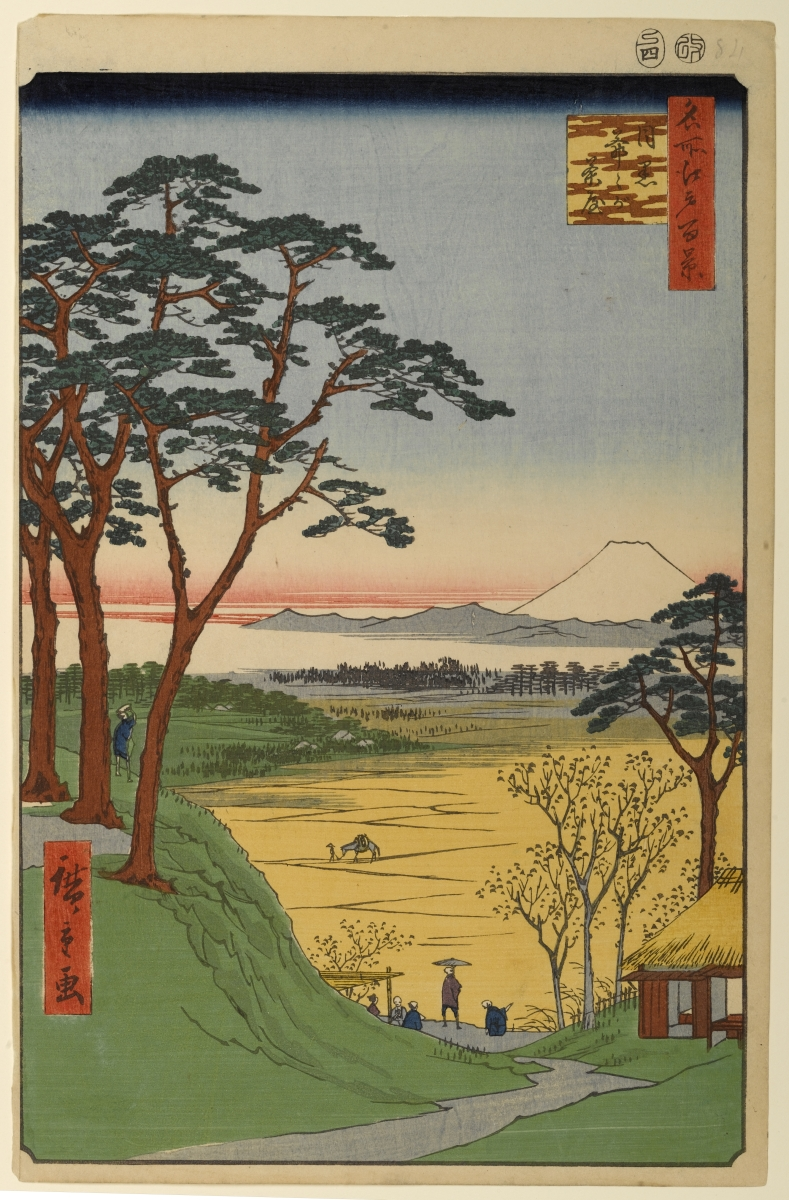
Hiroshige's "Meguro Jiji-ga-chaya Teahouse" from the "One Hundred Famous Views of Edo"

Mita (三田) is a quiet residential district of Meguro, Tokyo, Japan, and, most notably, is home to its landmark Yebisu Garden Place. Distinct from another district Mita, Minato, Tokyo, the district is sometimes referred to as Meguro-Mita.

As a part of Yebisu Garden Place, Tokyo Metropolitan Museum of Photography is located in Mita.

The district borders Ebisu and Ebisuminami on the north; Kamiōsaki on the east; Meguro on the south and (across Meguro River) on the west; and Nakameguro on the northwest.

== Facilities ==
- Embassy of Algeria in Japan
- Embassy of Poland in Japan
  - Polish Cultural Institute in Tokyo
- The Westin Tokyo
- Kohsei Chuo General Hospital

== Education ==
Meguro City Board of Education operates public elementary and junior high schools.

All of Mita (1-2 chōme) is zoned to Dendo Elementary School (田道小学校) and Otori Junior High School (大鳥中学校).
