= Indonesia Tokyo Mosque =

Mosque in Meguro, Tokyo, Japan

- Masjid Indonesia Tokyo
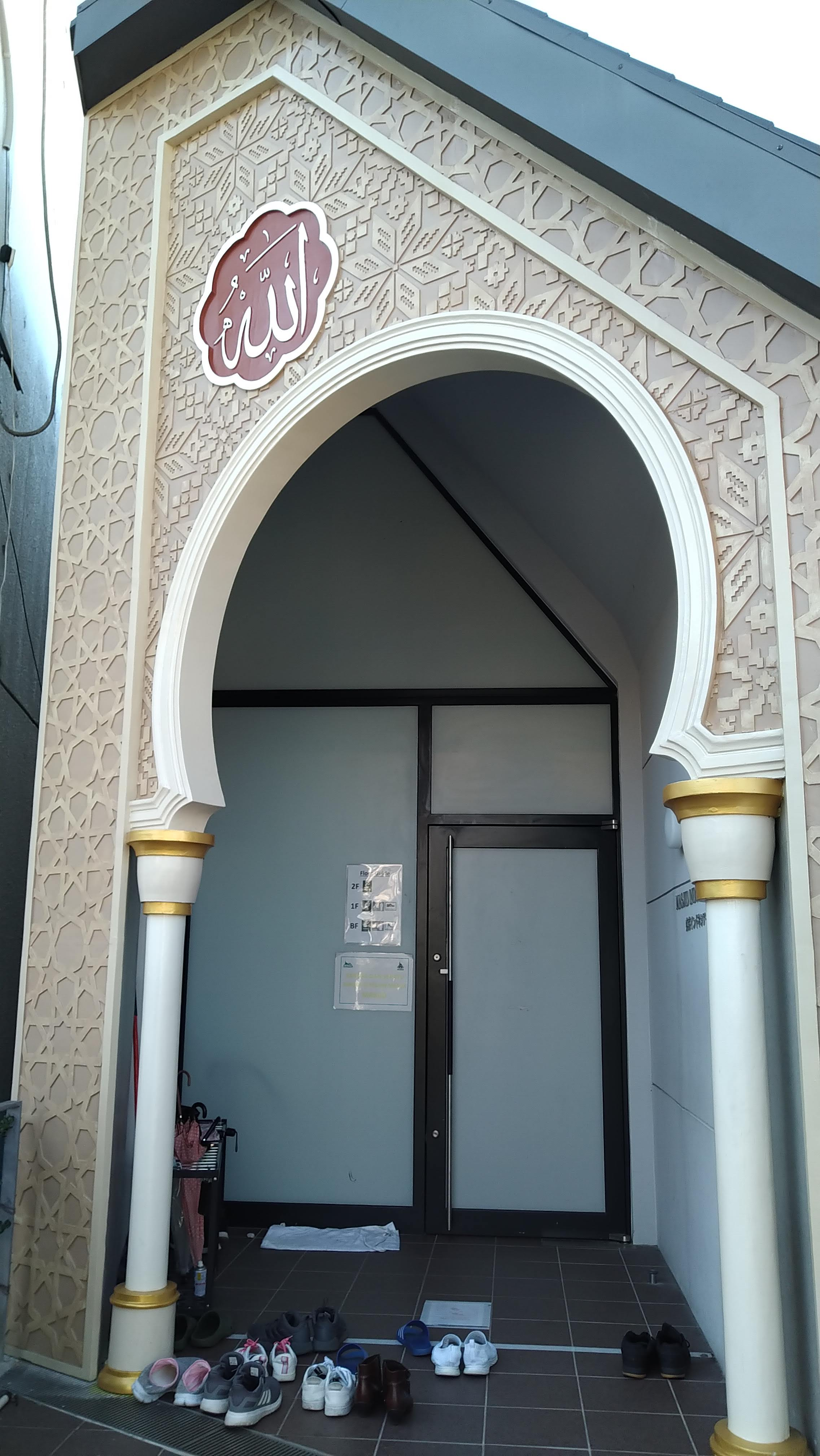

- Location of the mosque in Tokyo

Religion
- Affiliation: Sunni Islam
- Ecclesiastical or organizational status: Mosque
- Status: Active

Location
- Location: 4 Chome-6-6, Meguro, Tokyo
- Country: Japan
- Interactive map of Indonesia Tokyo Mosque
- Coordinates: 35°37′58″N 139°42′05″E

Architecture
- Groundbreaking: 2015

Specifications
- Capacity: 270 worshippers
- Interior area: 600 m^{2} (6,500 sq ft)
- Site area: 200 m^{2} (2,200 sq ft)

Website
- masjid-indonesia.jp

The Indonesia Tokyo Mosque (Indonesian: Masjid Indonesia Tokyo; Arabic: مسجد طوكيو اندونيسيا), also known as Meguro Mosque, is a mosque in Meguro, Tokyo, Japan.

== History ==
Initiated in c. 2000, construction of the mosque was funded with the support of Indonesian citizens living in Tokyo via the Family of Indonesian Islamic Community (KMII) and the Indonesian Ministry of Foreign Affairs. Once funds and a located were secured, he groundbreaking ceremony was completed during the 2015 Eid al-Fitr festival by the Indonesian Ambassador to Japan, Yusron Ihza Mahendra.

== Overview ==
The mosque has the maximum capacity of 270 worshippers and is located within the complex of the Republic of Indonesian School in Tokyo (SRIT). The building design consists of four floors with a total land area of 200 square metres (2,200 sq ft) and a floor area of 600 square metres (6,500 sq ft). The slope of the land is adjusted to the direction of qibla.

The prayer room consists of a basement, the first floor for men, and the second floor for women. On the first floor, there is a connecting door with a ramp for accessible use. The second floor is connected to SRIT hall so it can be used for congregational prayers such as Friday prayers and Eid prayers. There are two basements; the first of which is located to the right of the outside entrance, near the library and cultural center where information about Islam or Indonesia is accessible. The second basement is specifically for restrooms and ablution place, and kitchen facilities.

== See also ==
- Islam in Japan
- List of mosques in Japan
