= 2008 Meguro mayoral election =

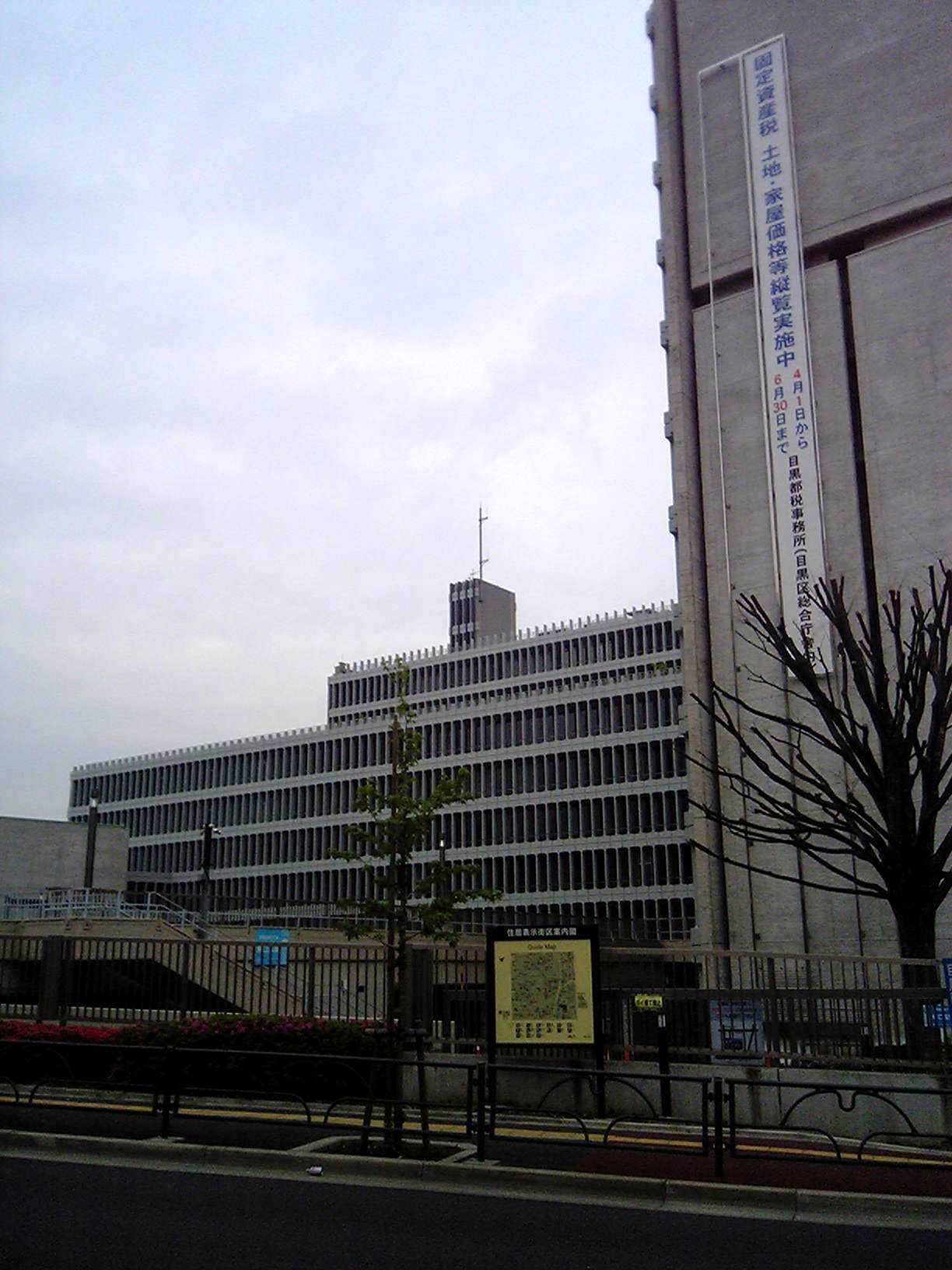
Meguro City Hall, where the mayor has his office.

Meguro, Tokyo held a mayoral election on April 20, 2008. Incumbent Eiji Aoki won.

== Candidates ==
- Eiji Aoki, 53, incumbent mayor, supported by the Liberal Democratic Party, Komeito, Democratic Party and the Social Democratic Party
- Mariko Nozawa, 61, former ward assemblywoman supported by the Japanese Communist Party.
- Miyoko Ankyu, 73, independent candidate working as a nurse.

== Issues ==
Both opposition candidates published manifestos focused on welfare, Miyoko Ankyu promised expanded health care schemes for elderly while Mariko Nozawa made poverty reduction a prioritized issue.

== Results ==
Mayoral election 2008: Meguro
Party	Candidate	Votes	%	±%
Independent, LDP, DPJ, Komeito, DPJ, SDP	Eiji Aoki	35,515		
Independent	Miyoko Ankyu	13,042		
Independent, JCP	Mariko Nozawa	8,124		
Turnout		57,849	27.27 %	−4.48 %
