= Yūtenji Station =

Railway station in Tokyo, Japan

Coordinates: 35.637505°N 139.691225°E

Yūtenji Station 祐天寺駅

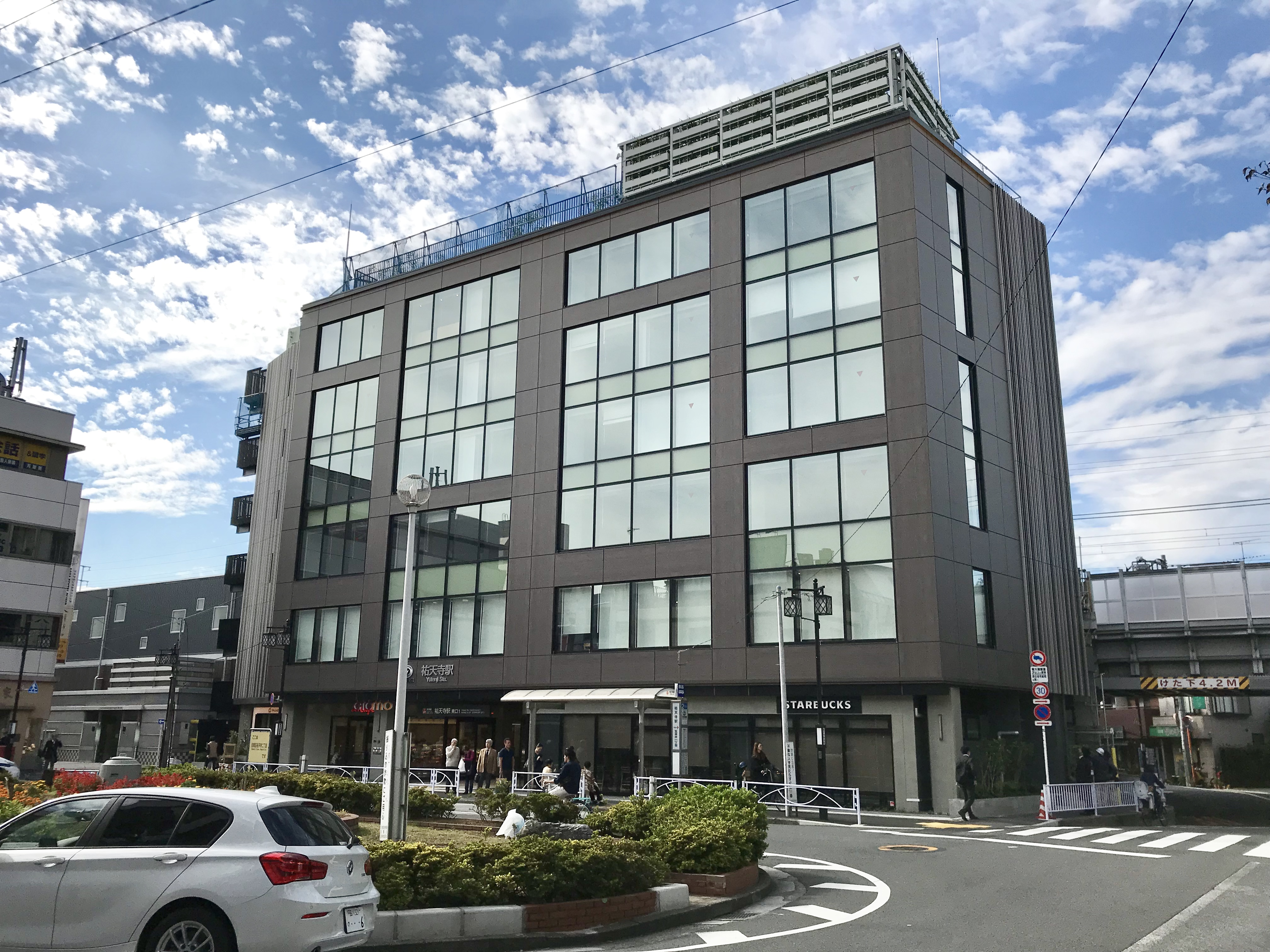
- The north entrance in June 2018

General information
- Location: 2-13-3 Yūtenji, Meguro Ward, Tokyo; Japan
- Operator: Tōkyū Railways
- Line: Tōyoko Line
- Distance: 3.2 km (2.0 mi) from Shibuya
- Platforms: 2 side platforms
- Tracks: 3

Construction
- Structure type: Elevated

Other information
- Station code: TY04
- Website: Official website (in Japanese)

History
- Opened: 28 August 1927; 98 years ago
- Rebuilt: 2013-2017

Passengers
- FY2011: 31,494 daily (2017)

Services
Preceding station	Tōkyū Railways	Following station
Gakugei-daigaku towards Yokohama	Tōyoko Line Local	Naka-meguro towards Shibuya
Location
- Location within Special wards of Tokyo Location within Tokyo Bay and Bōsō Peninsula Location within Tokyo Location within Japan

Yūtenji Station (祐天寺駅, Yūtenji-eki) is an elevated railway station on the Tōkyū Tōyoko Line in Meguro, Tokyo, Japan, operated by the private railway operator Tokyu Corporation.

== Lines ==
Yutenji Station is served by the Tokyu Toyoko Line from Shibuya in Tokyo. It is located 3.2 km from the terminus of the line at Shibuya.

== Station layout ==
This station has two opposed side platforms serving two tracks, with an additional center track introduced in March 2017 for use by non-stop trains. As the station is only served by all-stops local services, it can only accommodate trains of up to eight cars in length.

=== Platforms ===
1
2
Tōyoko Line
Tōyoko Line
- for Jiyūgaoka, Musashi-kosugi, Kikuna, and Yokohama
- Minatomirai Line for Motomachi-Chūkagai
- Sotetsu Izumino Line for Shōnandai via the Tokyu/Sotetsu Shin-Yokohama Line
for Naka-meguro and Shibuya
Fukutoshin Line for Shinjuku-sanchōme, Ikebukuro, Kotake-mukaihara and Wakoshi
Seibu Ikebukuro Line for Hannō
Tobu Tojo Line for Shinrin-kōen

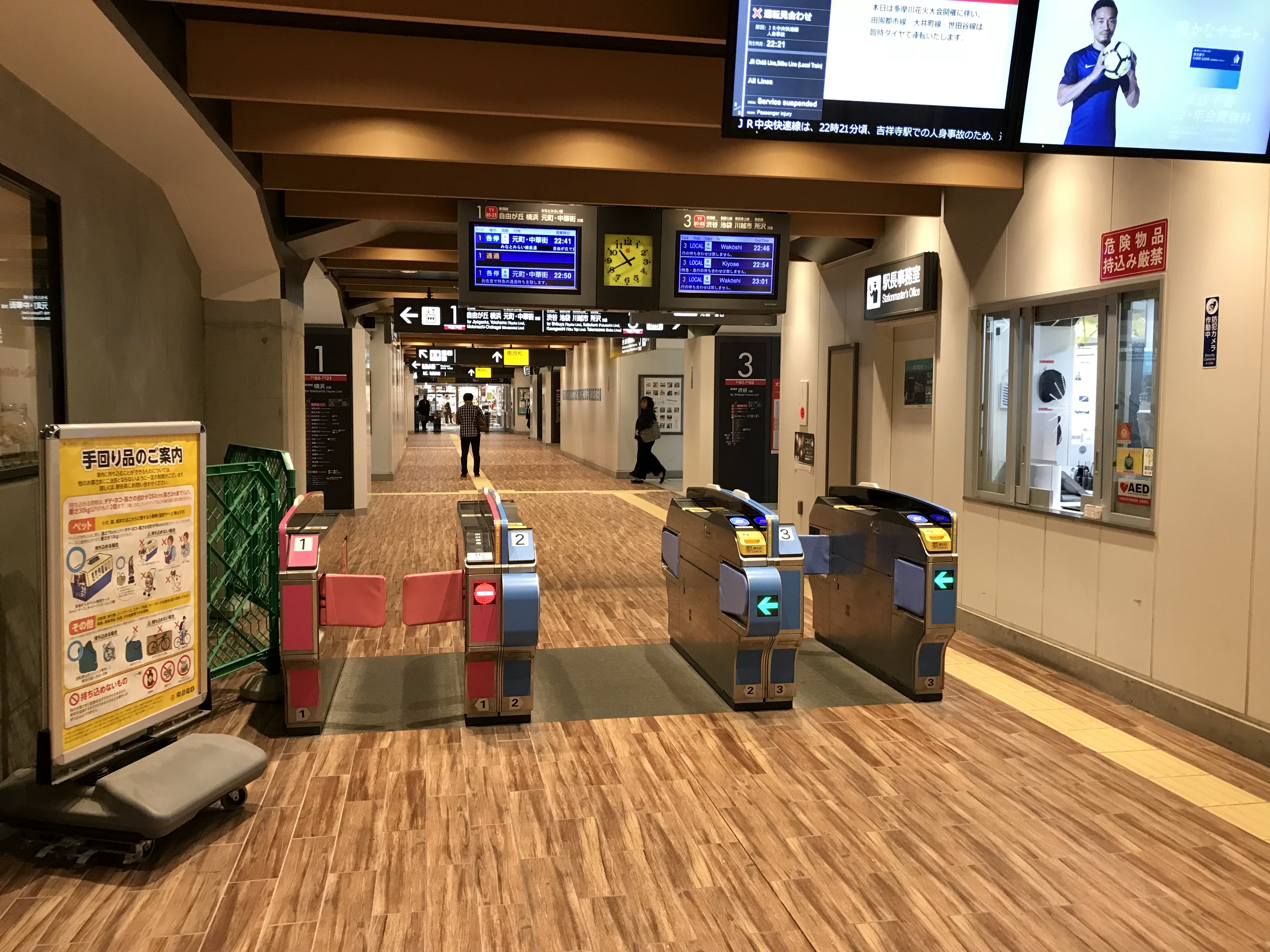
The ticket barriers in October 2018

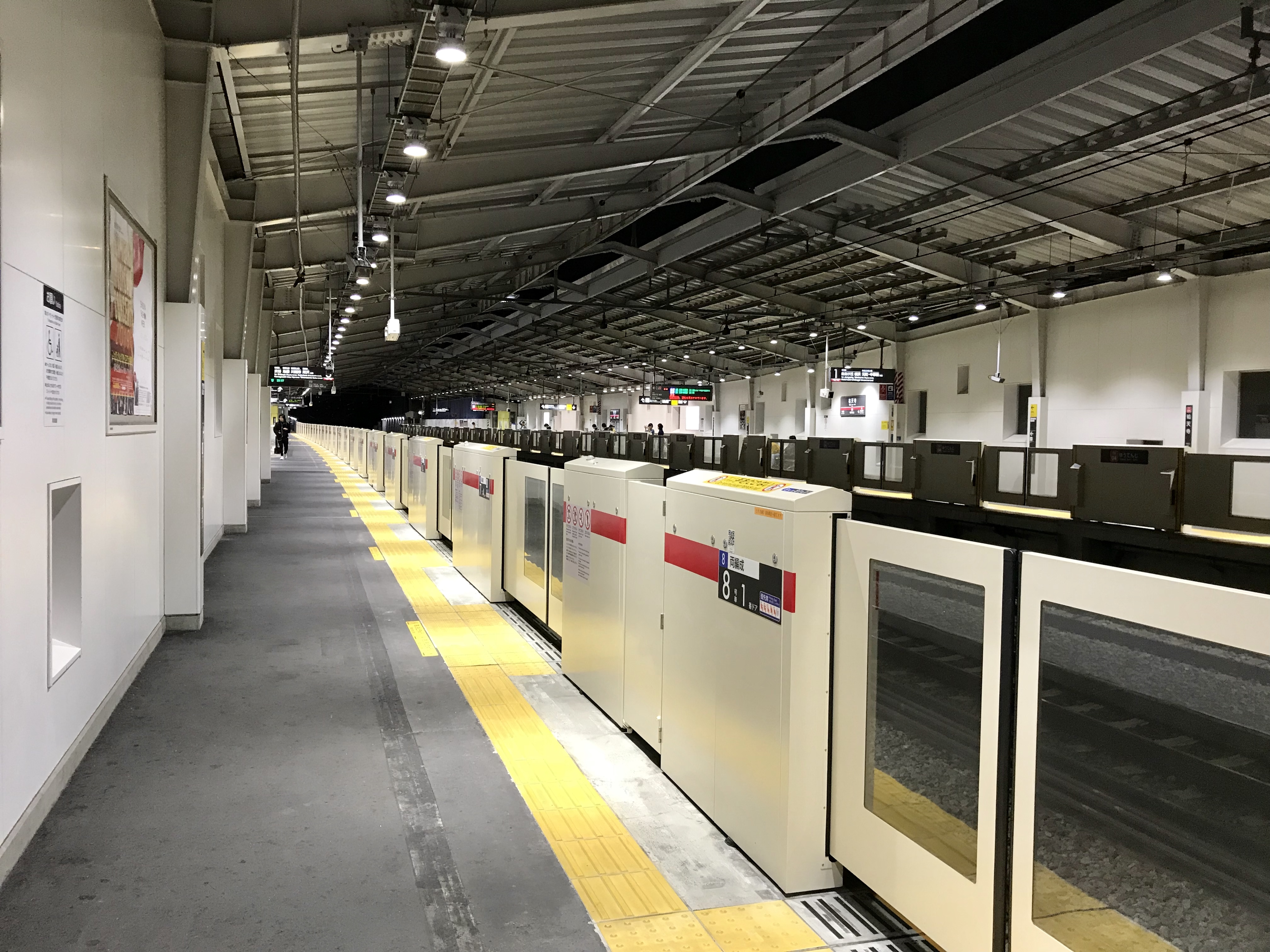
The platforms in October 2018

== History ==
Yutenji Station opened on 28 August 1927.

Remodeling work commenced in November 2013 to reduce the width of the platforms, enabling an additional center track to be added between the existing up and down lines for use by non-stop trains. The newly-added center track was brought into use from the start of the revised timetable on 25 March 2017.

== Passenger statistics ==
In the 2015 data available from Japan’s Ministry of Land, Infrastructure, Transport and Tourism, Yūtenji → Naka Meguro was one of the train segments among Tokyo's most crowded train lines during rush hour.

In fiscal 2017, the station was used by an average of 31,494 passengers daily.

== Surrounding area ==
- Meguro High School
- Yūtenji Temple
- Setagaya park

== See also ==
- List of railway stations in Japan
