= Shimomeguro =

Neighborhood in Meguro, Tokyo, Japan

Coordinates: 35°37′44″N 139°42′26″E

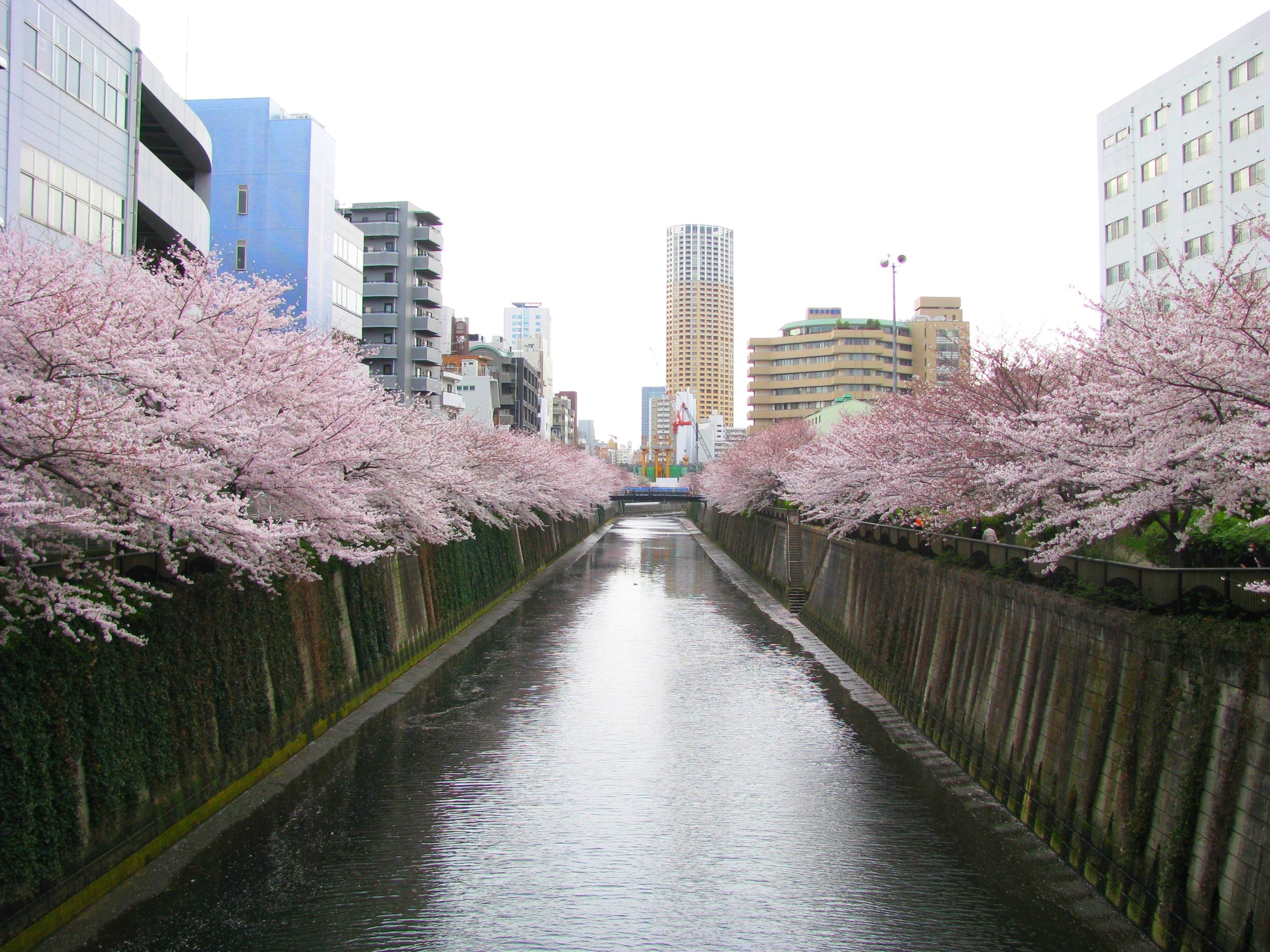
Meguro River

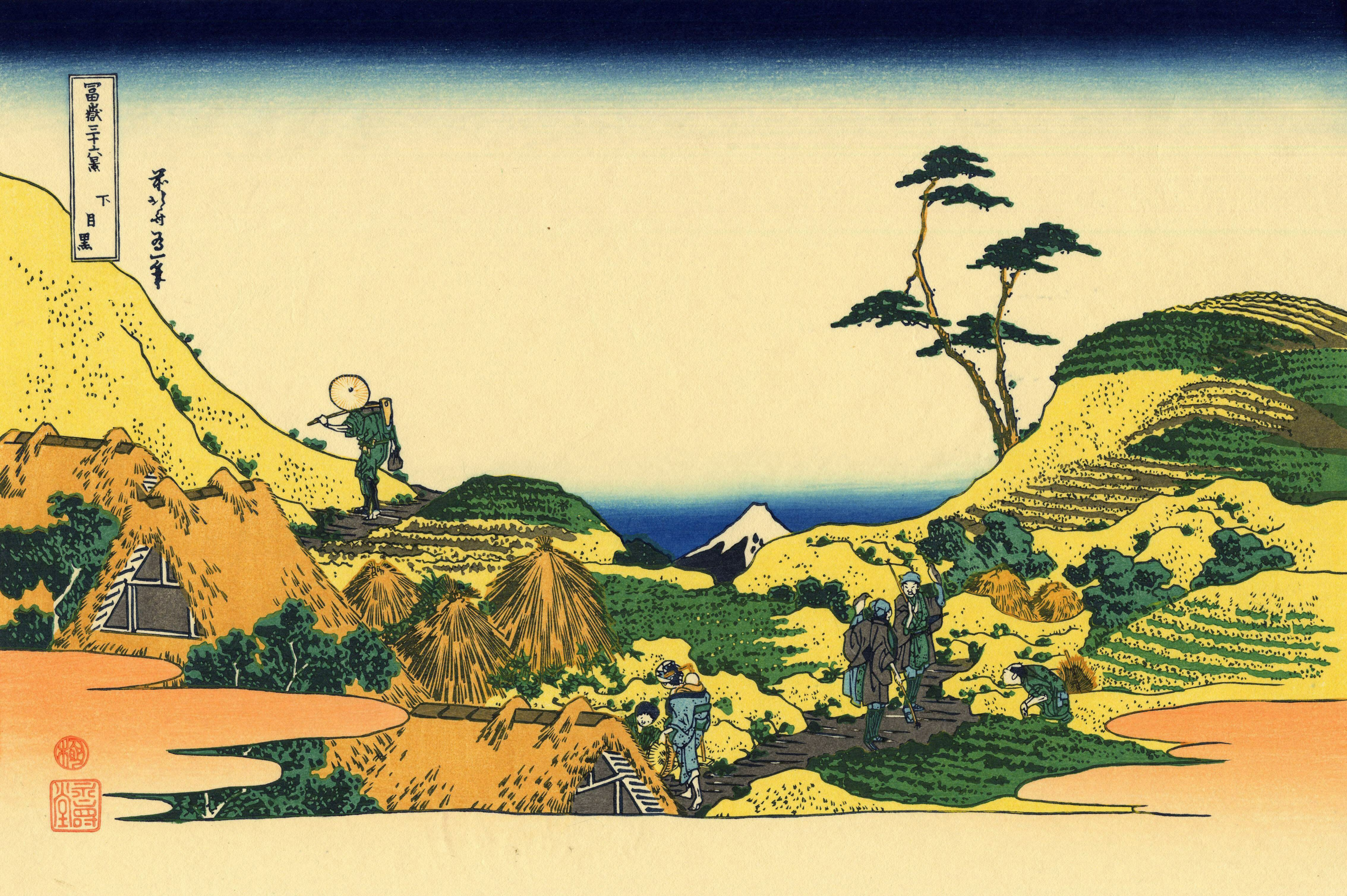
Hokusai's "Shimomeguro" from the Thirty-six Views of Mount Fuji

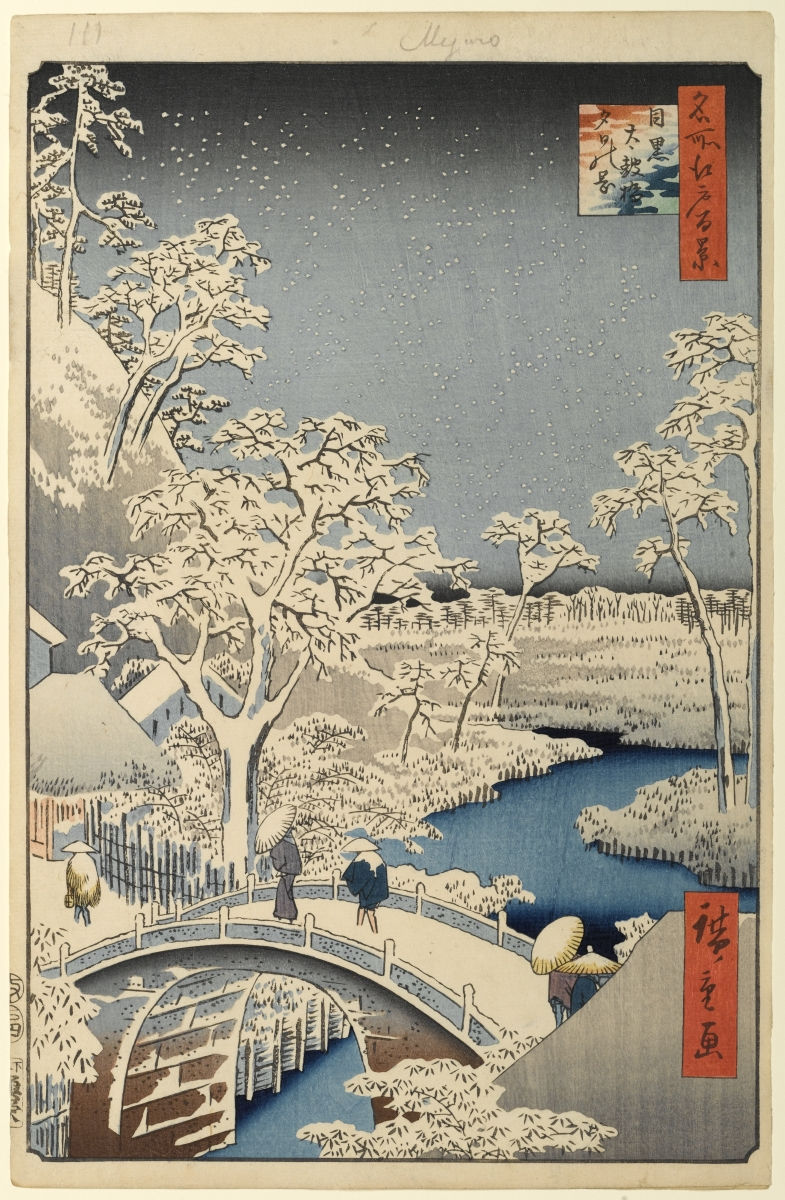
Hiroshige's "Meguro Taiko Bridge" from One Hundred Famous Views of Edo

Shimomeguro (下目黒) is a district located in the eastern portion of Meguro, Tokyo, Japan. It consists of 1- to 6-chōme.

Shimomeguro is home to Ryūsenji (瀧泉寺), also known as Meguro Fudō (目黒不動).

Meguro Gajoen (目黒雅叙園) is a historic hotel and restaurant building located on the eastern edge of Shimomeguro.

== Landmarks and facilities ==
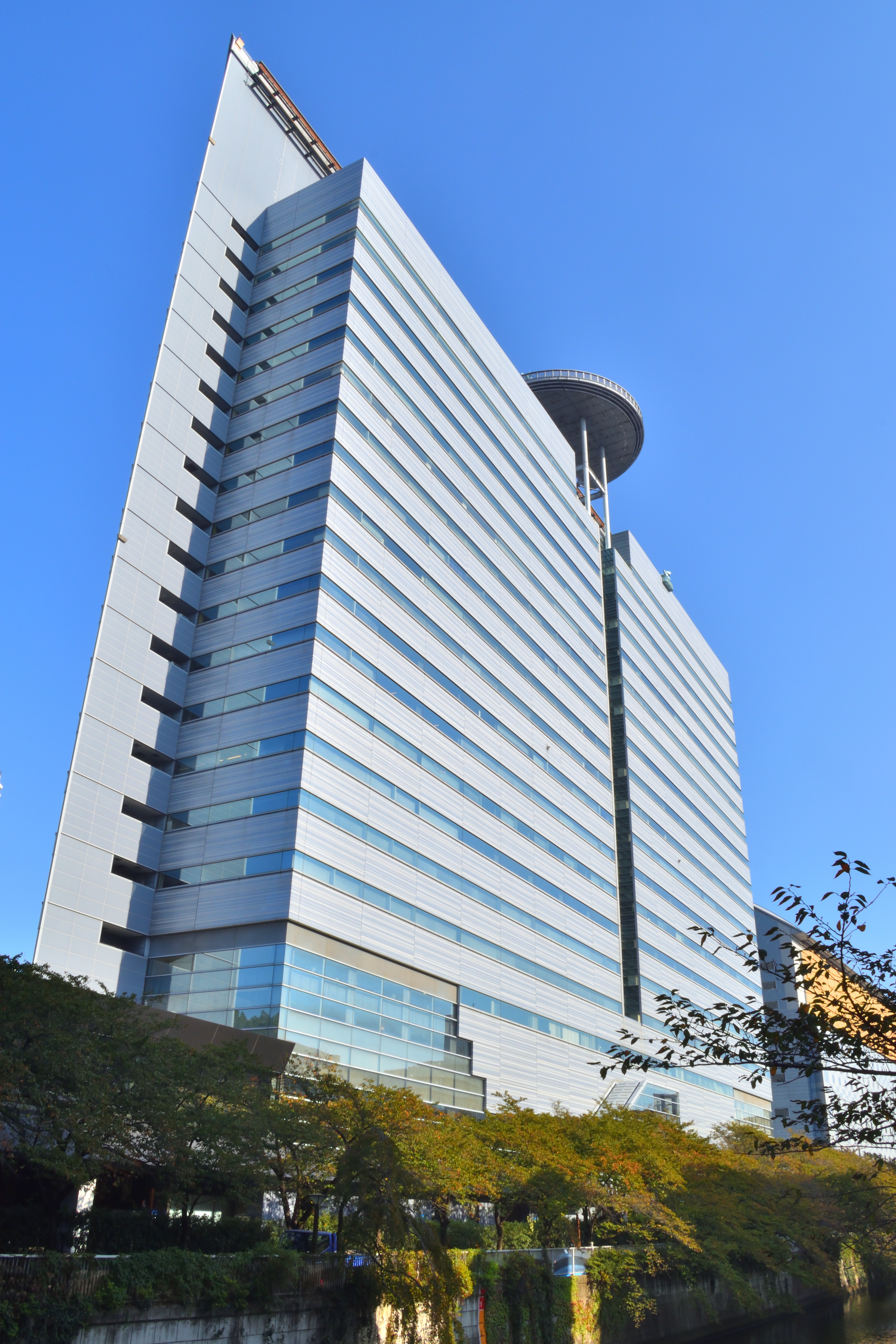
ARCO TOWER at Meguro Gajoen

- Meguro River
- Embassy of Nepal
- Embassy of Papua New Guinea
- Royal Thai Embassy Military Attaché Office
- Meguro Parasitological Museum
- Yamaha Music Foundation head office
- Horipro head office
- Books Kinokuniya head office
- Meguro Gajoen
  - ARCO TOWER, a 19-story office building
    - Amazon Japan head office
- Rinshi-no-mori Park
- Tama University Meguro High School
- Ōtori Shrine, a Shintō shrine established in 806
- Ryūsen-ji
  - Grave of Aoki Konyō
  - Grave of Shūmei Ōkawa
  - Cenotaph and grave of Ikki Kita
- St. Alexander Nevsky's Russian Orthodox Church

== Education ==
Meguro City Board of Education operates public elementary and junior high schools.

Shimomeguro 1-3 chōme are zoned to Shimomeguro Elementary School (下目黒小学校), while 4-6-chōme are zoned to Fudō Elementary School (不動小学校). All of Shimomeguro (1-6 chōme) is zoned to Ōtori Junior High School (大鳥中学校).
