= Ryūsen-ji =

Building in Shimo-Meguro, Tokyo, Japan

- 瀧泉寺
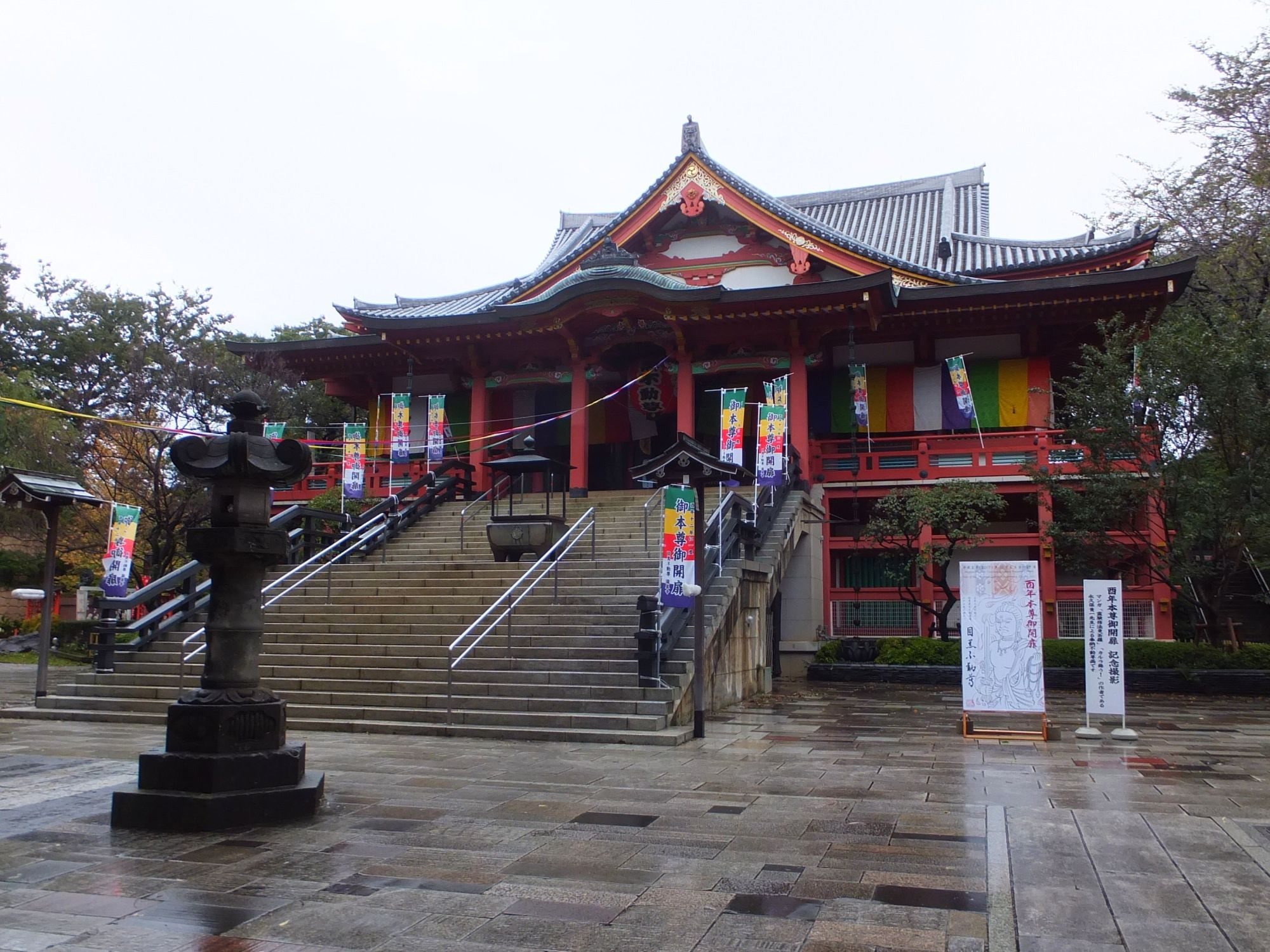
- Ryūsen-ji Hondō

- Location within Tokyo Location within Japan

Religion
- Affiliation: Buddhism
- Deity: Fudō-myōō
- Rite: Tendai
- Status: active

Location
- Location: 3-20-26 Shimomeguro, Meguro, Tokyo 153-0064
- Country: Japan
- Interactive map of Ryūsen-ji
- Coordinates: 35°37′43″N 139°42′29″E

Architecture
- Founder: Ennin (?)
- Completed: 808 AD (?)

Website
- Official website

Ryūsenji (瀧泉寺) also known as the Meguro Fudō (目黒不動, Black-eyed Fudō) is a Buddhist temple located in Meguro, Tokyo, Japan. The temple currently belongs to the Tendai school of Japanese Buddhism, and its main image is a hibutsu statue of Fudō-myōō. The temple is 18th of the Kantō Sanjūroku Fudō pilgrimage route of 36 temples in the Kantō region dedicated to Fudō-myōō.

== History ==
According to the temple legend, Ryūsen-ji was built in 808 by Ennin to enshrine a statue of Fudō-myōō, while he was on a journey from Shimotsuke province to Mount Hiei. It is one of many temples in eastern Japan whose histories are uncertain or unknown, which have the tradition that they were founded by Ennin. It is unclear what veracity, if any, these legends have. The temple does date to the early Heian period, as written records from the year 860 indicate that Emperor Seiwa authorized a change in the temple's mountain name to "Taeisan". However, the temple disappears from the historical record for many centuries, reappearing only in the early Edo period.

In 1615, the main hall was destroyed by a fire. In 1630, it became a subsidiary temple of Kanei-ji, and was one of the temples restored and enlarged by Tenkai with the patronage of Shogun Tokugawa Iemitsu. The name of the surrounding district of "Meguro" derives its name from Ryūsen-ji's black-eyed statue of Fudō-myōō, one of five protective Fudō-myōō statues placed at strategic points on the outskirts of Edo, the capital of the Tokugawa shogunate. Each statue had eyes of a different color. (Another Tokyo ward, Mejiro is named for the white-eyed Fudō-myōō). During the Edo period, the temple was famous as the location of a lottery. It was also popularly believed that bathing in the springs or waterfall at the temple would cure illness, and the temple was thus depicted in the Edo meisho zue and other guidebooks as one of the major sightseeing spots of Edo. The temple town which developed surrounding the temple was noted for bamboo products, and for dishes either containing bamboo shoots or in the shape of bamboo, the plant having been introduced to Edo as a commercial crop by the Shimazu clan of Satsuma Domain in the mid-Edo period.

Ryūsen-ji is famed as the burial place of the romantic couple Hirai Gonpachi (平井権八) and Komurasaki (小紫), whose story was told in numerous Kabuki plays and in A.B. Mitford's Tales of Old Japan. The temple is also an important site for the friendship between Filipino national hero Jose Rizal and Seiko Usui (Osei-san), a daughter of a samurai.

Much of the temple was destroyed in a fire in May 1978, and thus most of its current structures are modern.

== Grave of Aoki Konyō ==
One of the few Edo period structures in the temple to have survived the 1978 fire is the Seishi-dō chapel. Built in the mid-Edo period, it is a Designated Tangible Cultural Property of Meguro Ward. In the vicinity of this temple is a memorial monument to the composer Nagayo Motoori and another to the pre-war political philosopher Ikki Kita, whose grave is also at the temple. The cemetery of this chapel also has the grave of Aoki Konyō (1698-1769) was a Confucian scholar in the middle of the Edo period remembered as the person who popularized the cultivation of sweet potatoes in Japan. The tomb is a simple stone monument with the words "Konyo-sensei's tomb" engraved on it, and is said to have been erected by Konyō in his lifetime. It was designated a National Historic Site in 1943.

== Gallery ==
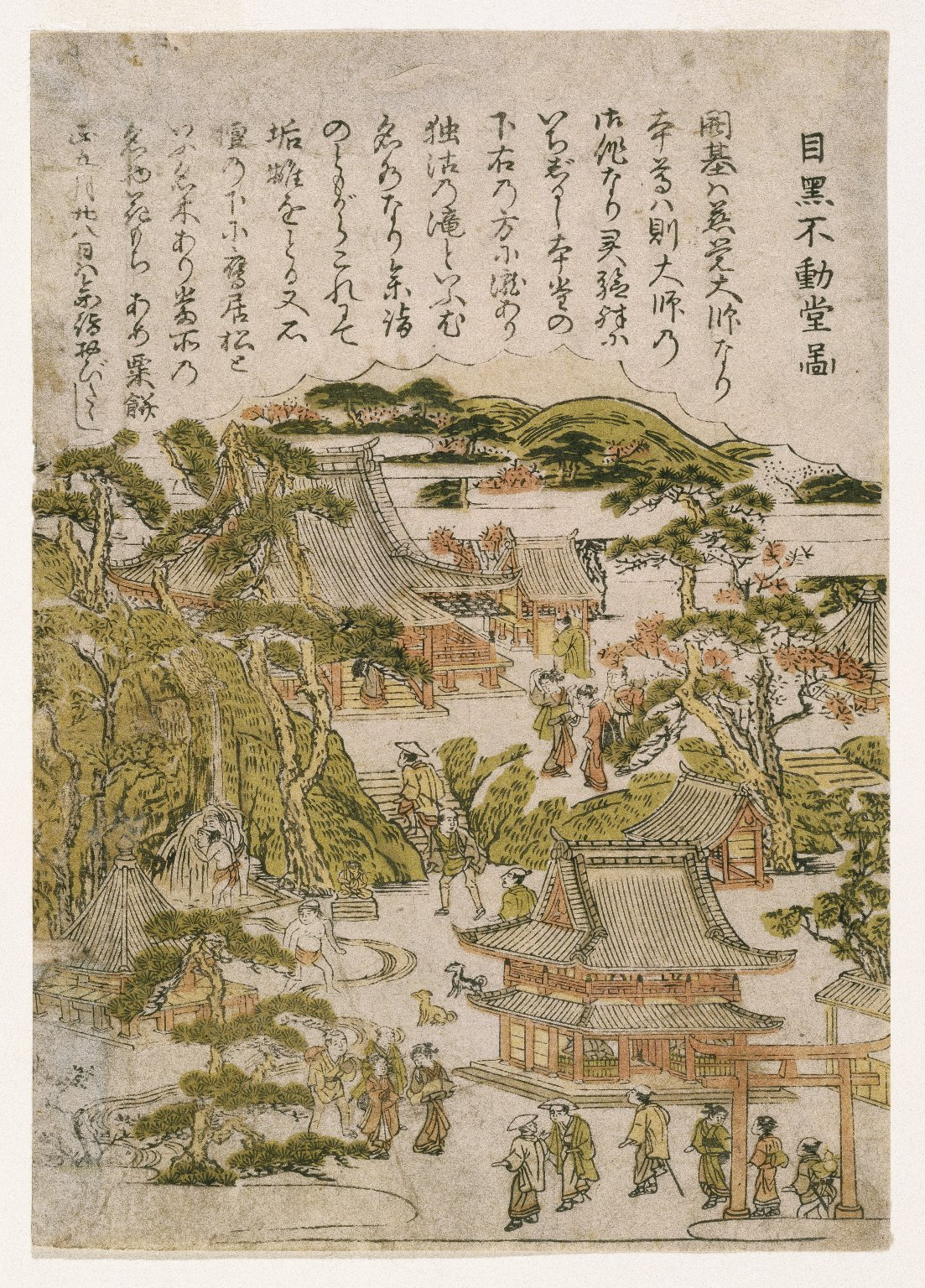
Meguro Fudo Temple by Kitao Shigemasa, c. 1770.

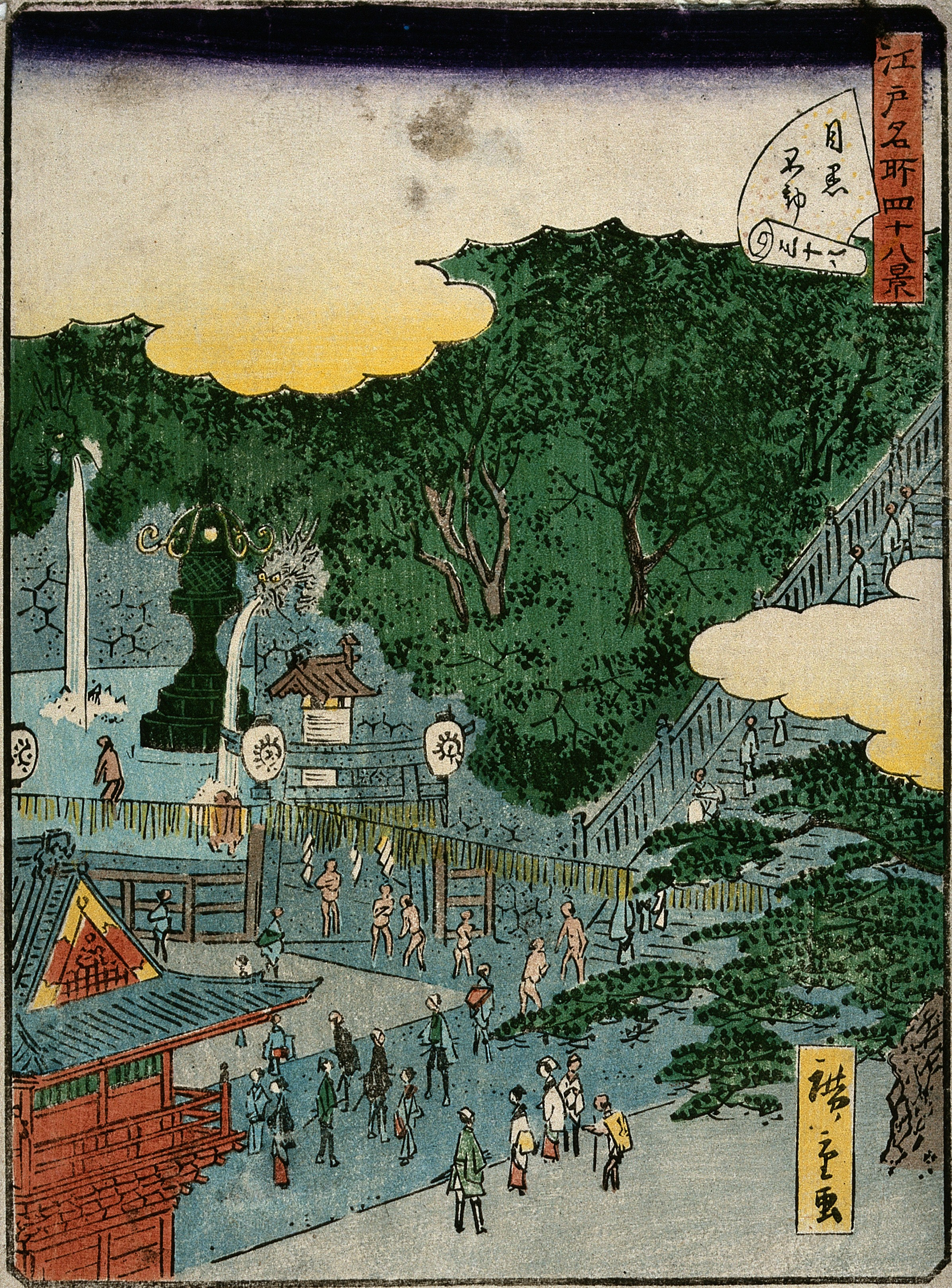
ukiyoe by Hiroshige depicting the Meguro Fudō

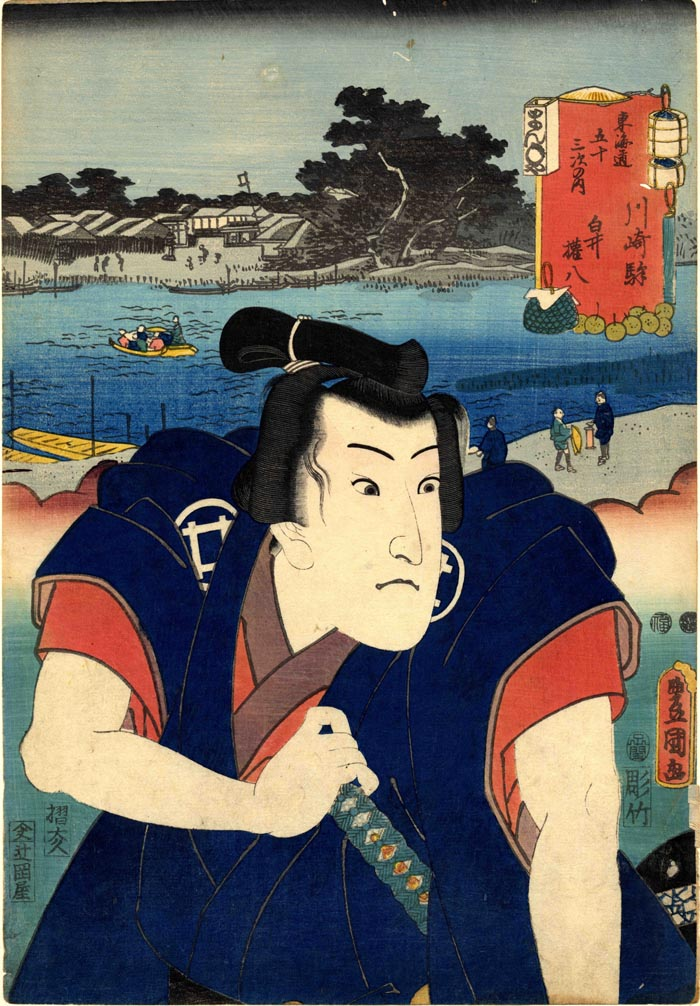
Shirai Gonpachi by Kunisada, 1852, a Kabuki character based on Hirai Gonpachi.

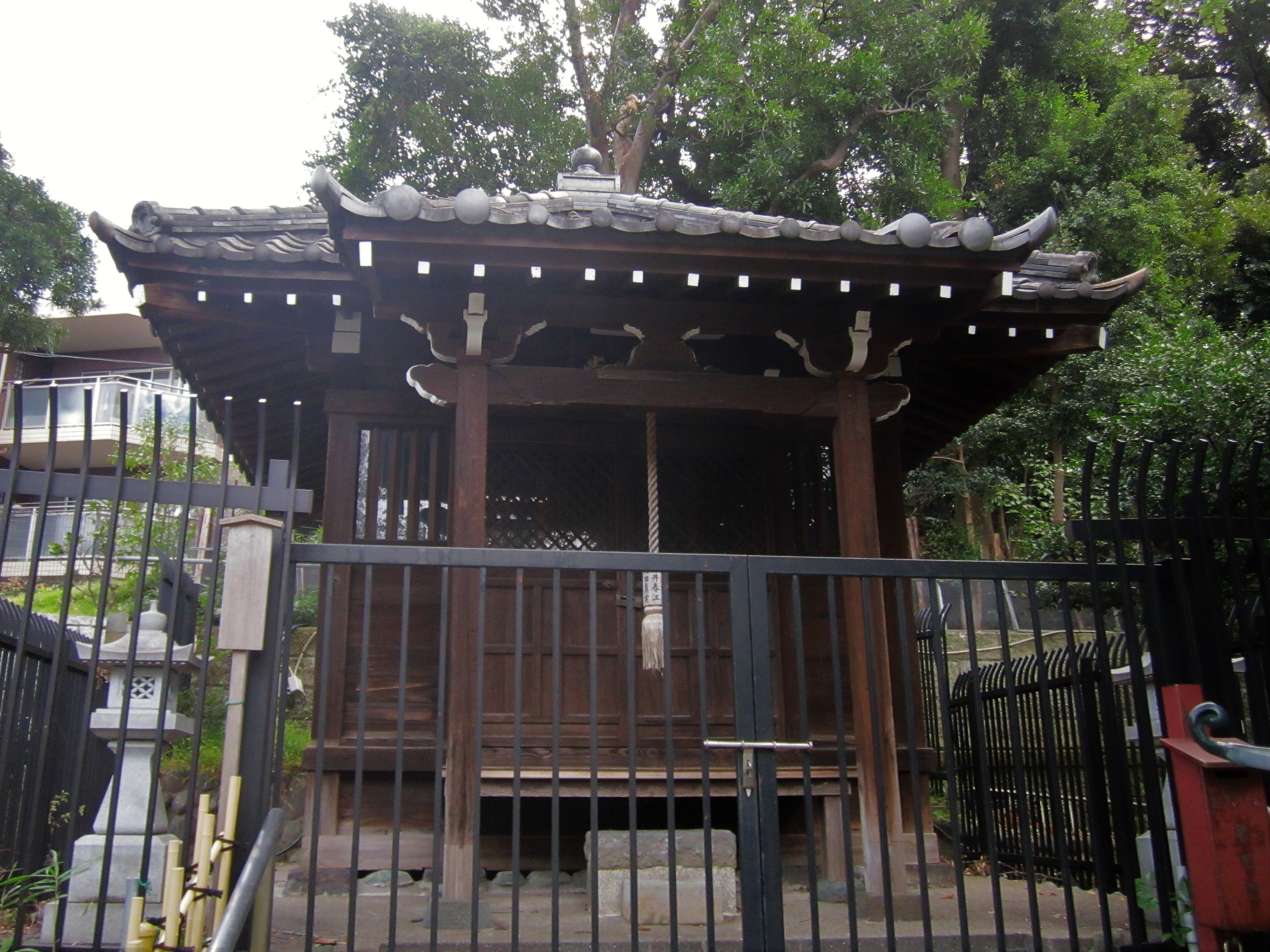
Seishi-dō

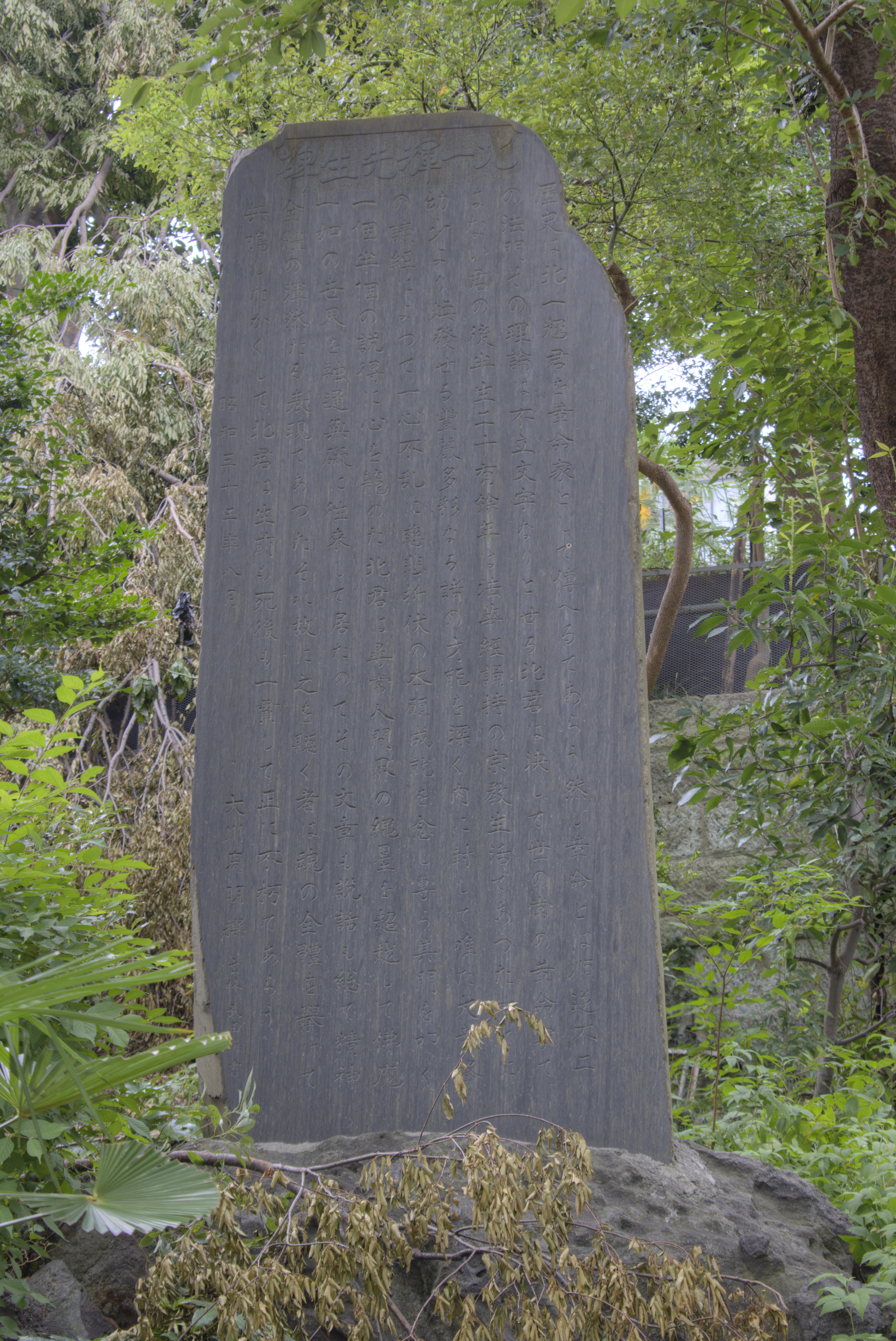
Ikki Kita monument

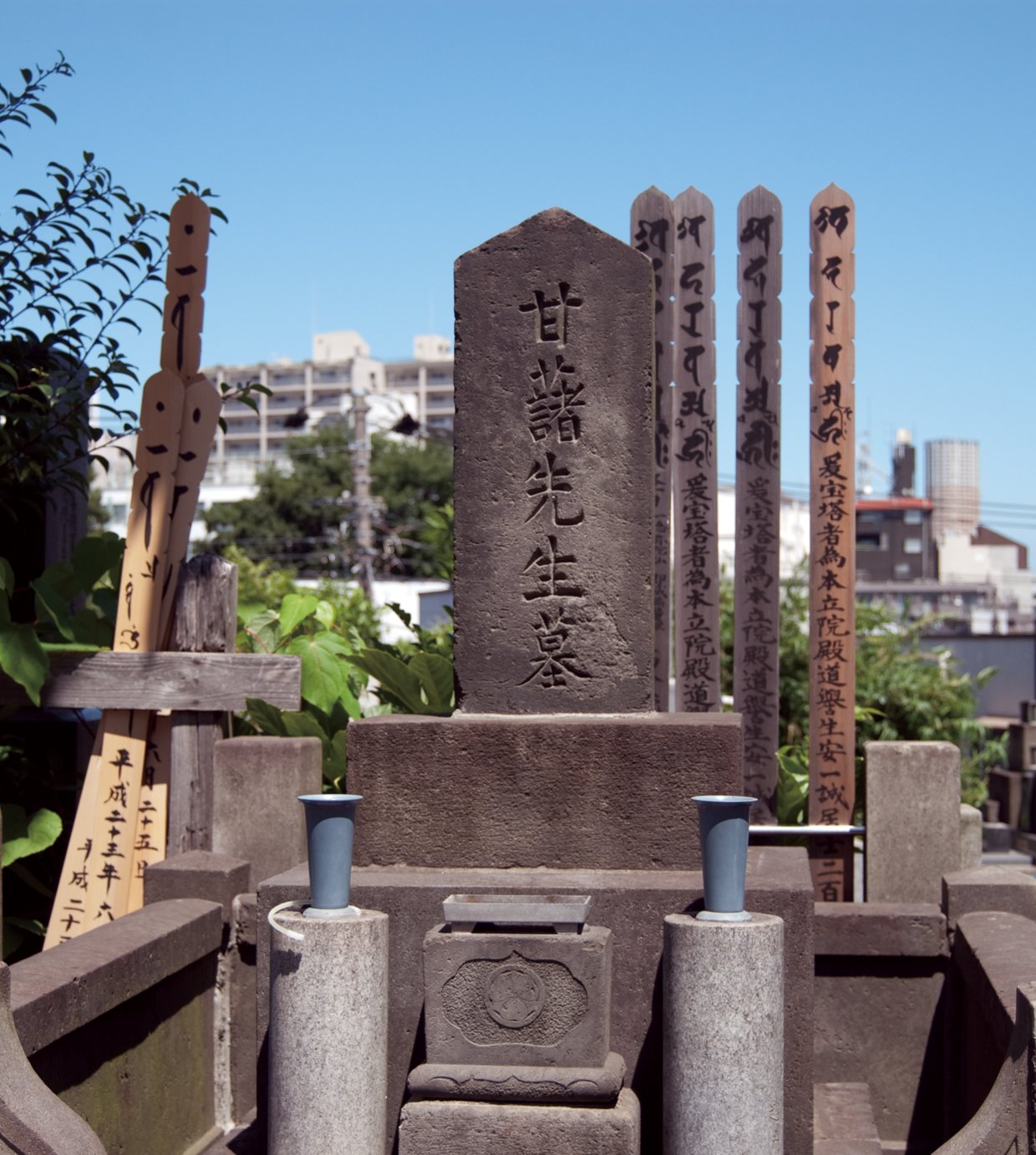
Grave of Aoki Konyō
