= Meguro (surname) =

Meguro (written: 目黒) is a Japanese surname. Notable people with the surname include:

- Yūki Meguro (目黒祐樹; born 1947), Japanese actor
- Shoji Meguro (目黒将司; born 1971), Japanese composer
- Moe Meguro (目黒萌絵; born 1984), Japanese curler
- Ren Meguro (目黒蓮; born 1997), Japanese singer
