= Meguro Parasitological Museum =

- 目黒寄生虫館
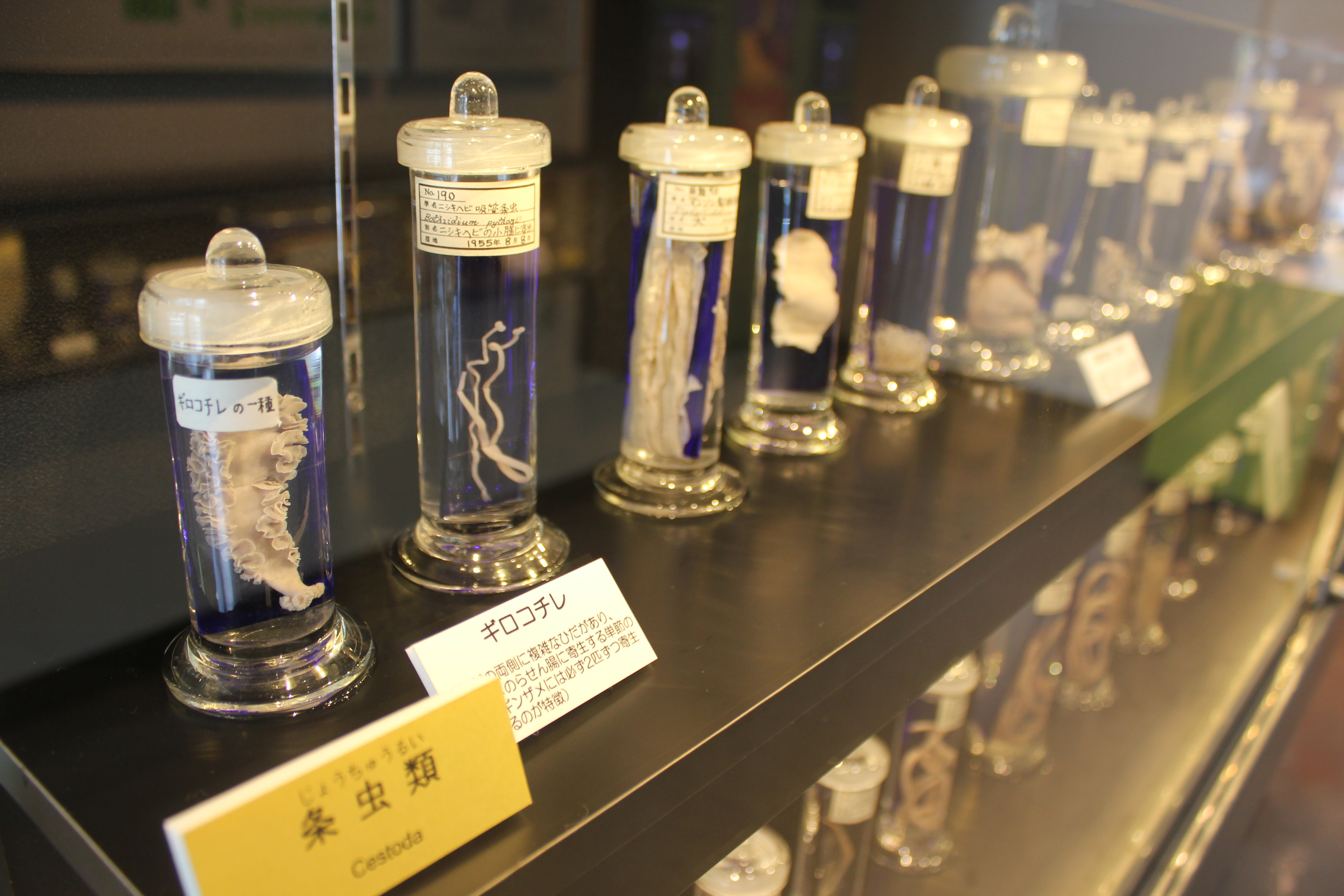
- Parasite specimens on display at the museum
- Established: 1953
- Location: Meguro, Tokyo
- Coordinates: 35°37′54″N 139°42′24″E
- Type: Science museum
- Collection size: 60,000 specimens, 300 on exhibit
- Visitors: 57300
- Founder: Dr. Satoru Kamegai
- Director: Dr. Toshiaki Kuramochi
- Public transit access: Meguro Station
- Website: www.kiseichu.org/e-top

The Meguro Parasitological Museum (Japanese: 目黒寄生虫館, Hepburn: Meguro kiseichūkan) is a small science museum in the Meguro Ward in central Tokyo, Japan. The museum is devoted to parasites and the science of parasitology, and was founded in 1953 by Dr. Satoru Kamegai.

== History ==
The museum rebuilt to its present location in 1993. Dr. Kamegai died in 2002 and Professor Akihiko Uchida took over operations of the museum adding the gift shop to help fund operations.

== Museum ==
The two-story exhibition space provides an educational overview of the diversity of parasites in the natural world and their life cycles. The second floor exhibition space has an emphasis on parasites in humans and their effects (including the nematode, the trematode, and the tapeworm). On display are 300 preserved specimens, including an 8.8 metres (29 ft)-long Diphyllobothrium nihonkaiense tapeworm. The research library contains 60,000 parasite specimens, as well as 50,000 papers and 5,000 books on parasitology.

The museum has a gift counter on the second floor, where visitors can purchase a museum guidebook, postcards, T-shirts, or mobile-phone straps with actual parasites embedded in acrylic (either Nybelinia surmenicola or Oncomelania nosophora). The museum is free to visitors and relies on donations because it is private and does not receive government funds.
