= Ebisuminami, Shibuya =

District in Shibuya, Tokyo, Japan

Ebisuminami 恵比寿南
- Neighborhood in Shibuya
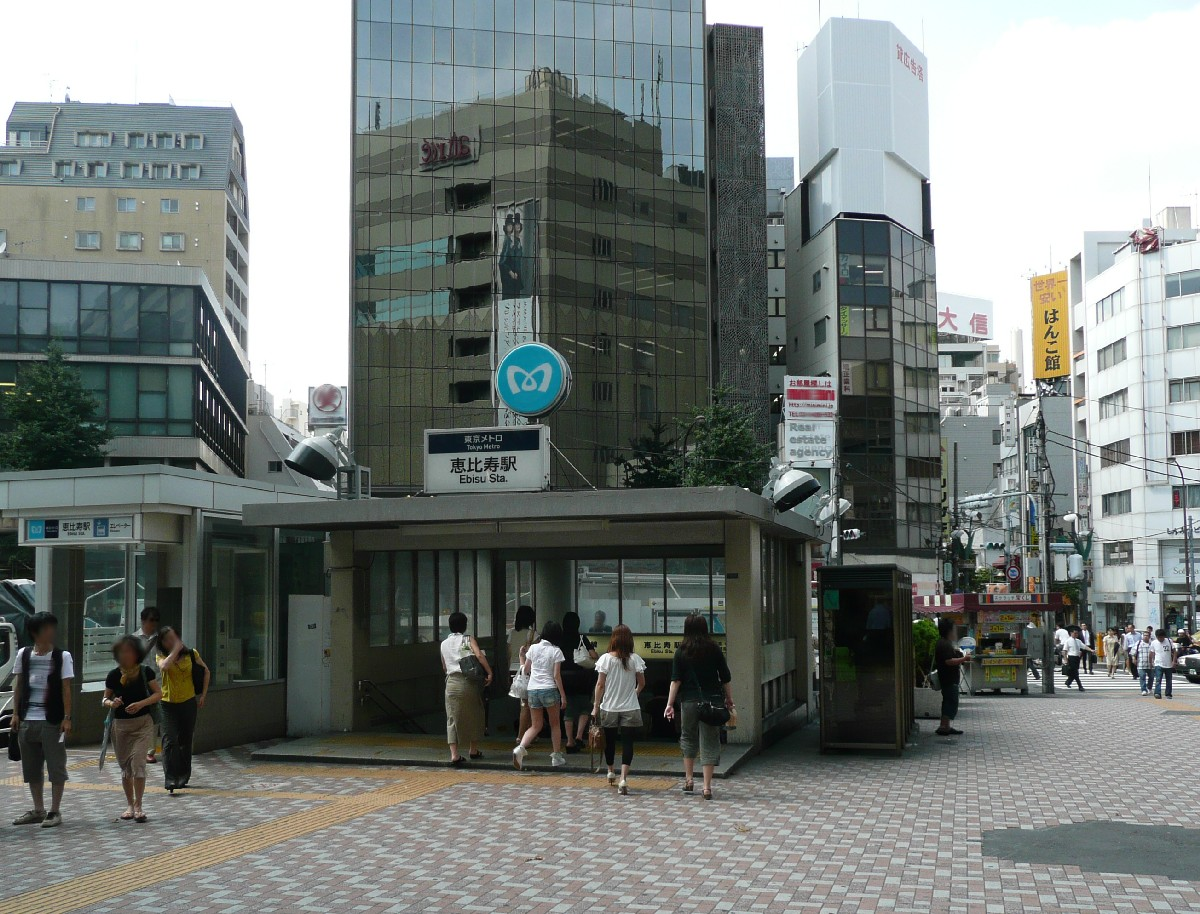
- Ebisu Station

- Location in Tokyo
- Country: Japan
- Prefecture: Tokyo
- Special ward: Shibuya

Population (1 October 2020)
  - Total: 4,737
- Time zone: UTC+09:00
- ZIP code: 150-0022
- Telephone area code: 03

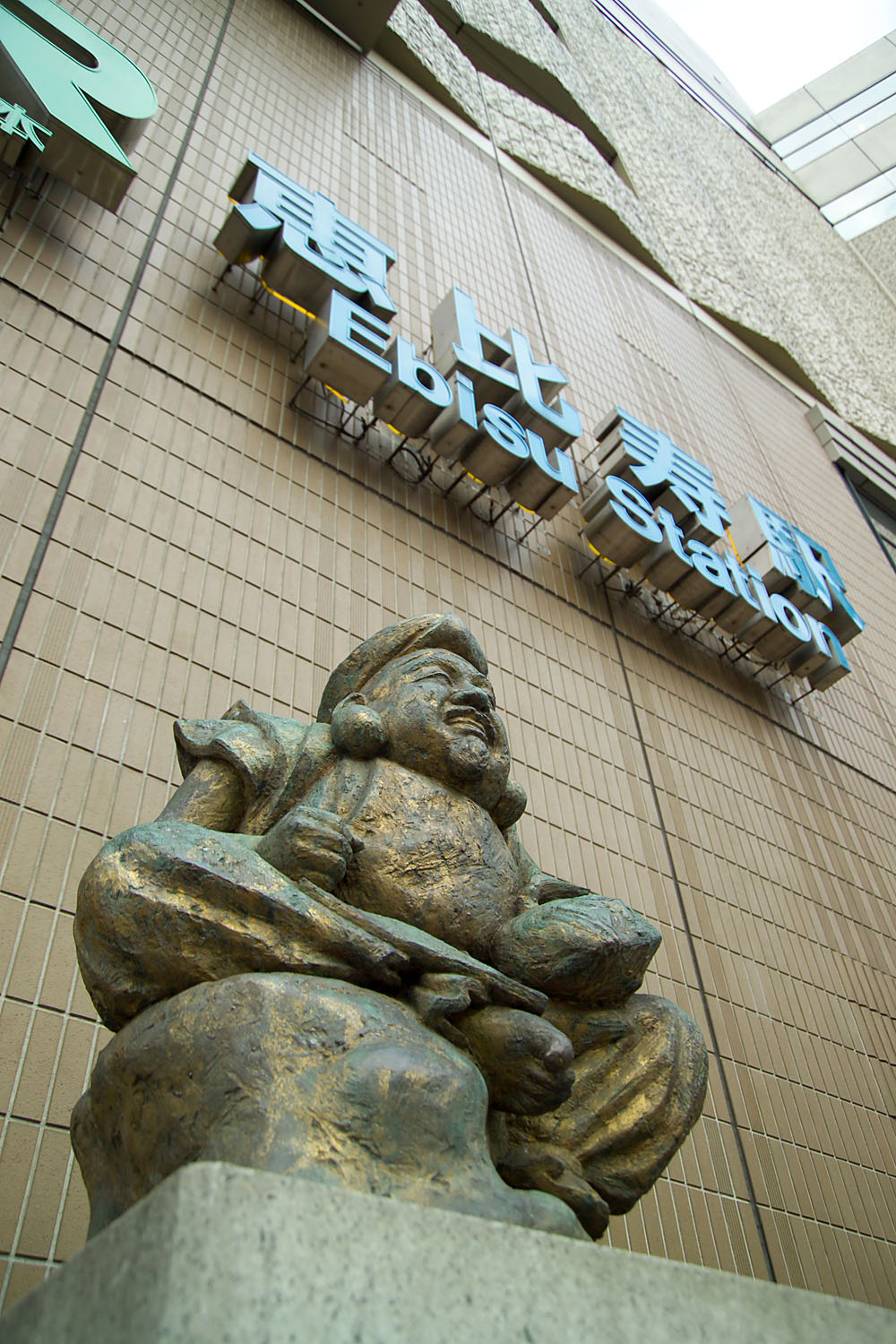
The Statue of Ebisu

Ebisuminami (恵比寿南, Ebisuminami) is a small district of Shibuya, Tokyo, located to the southeast of Ebisu Station. The district is often perceived as a portion of the broad-sense Ebisu area. Ebisuminami borders Ebisu district in the narrow sense on the northwest across Ebisu Station, the mailing address for which is Ebisuminami, rather than Ebisu, Shibuya.

The Statue of Ebisu (えびす像), built in 1975, in front of Ebisu Station's west exit is a landmark of the Ward of Shibuya.

The beverage company Calpis (カルピス) is headquartered in Ebisu Minami 2-chōme.

== Ward parks ==
Parks include:

- Ebisuminami Machikado Kōen (恵比寿南まちかど公園)
- Ebisuminami Ichi Kōen (恵比寿南一公園)
- Ebisuminami Ni Kōen (恵比寿南二公園)

== Education ==
Shibuya Board of Education operates public elementary and junior high schools.

Ebisuminami 1-chome 18-26-ban and 2-chome 12-18 and 20-31-ban are zoned to Kakezuka Elementary School (加計塚小学校) and Hiroo Junior High School (広尾中学校). Ebisuminami 3-chome, 1-chome 1-17-ban, and 2-chome 1-11 and 19-ban are zoned to Nagayato Elementary School (長谷戸小学校) and Hachiyama Junior High School (鉢山中学校).
