= 1956 in Japan =

- Decades: 1930s; 1940s; 1950s; 1960s; 1970s
- See also: Other events of 1956; History of Japan; Timeline; Years

Events in the year 1956 in Japan. It corresponds to Shōwa 31 (昭和31年) in the Japanese calendar.

== Incumbents ==
- Emperor: Hirohito
- Prime Minister: Ichirō Hatoyama (Liberal Democratic) until December 23, Tanzan Ishibashi (Liberal Democratic)
- Chief Cabinet Secretary: Ryutaro Nemoto until December 23, Hirohide Ishida
- Chief Justice of the Supreme Court: Kōtarō Tanaka
- President of the House of Representatives: Shūji Masutani
- President of the House of Councillors: Yahachi Kawai until April 3, Tsuruhei Matsuno

=== Governors ===
- Aichi Prefecture: Mikine Kuwahara
- Akita Prefecture: Yūjirō Obata
- Aomori Prefecture: Bunji Tsushima (until 1 June); Iwao Yamazaki (starting 20 July)
- Chiba Prefecture: Hitoshi Shibata
- Ehime Prefecture: Sadatake Hisamatsu
- Fukui Prefecture: Seiichi Hane
- Fukuoka Prefecture: Taichi Uzaki
- Fukushima Prefecture: Sakuma Ootake
- Gifu Prefecture: Kamon Muto
- Gunma Prefecture: Shigeo Kitano (until 1 August); Toshizo Takekoshi (starting 2 August)
- Hiroshima Prefecture: Hiroo Ōhara
- Hokkaido: Toshifumi Tanaka
- Hyogo Prefecture: Masaru Sakamoto
- Ibaraki Prefecture: Yoji Tomosue
- Ishikawa Prefecture: Jūjitsu Taya
- Iwate Prefecture: Senichi Abe
- Kagawa Prefecture: Masanori Kaneko
- Kagoshima Prefecture: Katsushi Terazono
- Kanagawa Prefecture: Iwataro Uchiyama
- Kochi Prefecture: Masumi Mizobuchi
- Kumamoto Prefecture: Saburō Sakurai
- Kyoto Prefecture: Torazō Ninagawa
- Mie Prefecture: Satoru Tanaka
- Miyagi Prefecture: Otogorō Miyagi (until 4 October); Yasushi Onuma (starting 5 October)
- Miyazaki Prefecture: Jingo Futami
- Nagano Prefecture: Torao Hayashi
- Nagasaki Prefecture: Takejirō Nishioka
- Nara Prefecture: Ryozo Okuda
- Niigata Prefecture: Kazuo Kitamura
- Oita Prefecture: Kaoru Kinoshita
- Okayama Prefecture: Yukiharu Miki
- Osaka Prefecture: Bunzō Akama
- Saga Prefecture: Naotsugu Nabeshima
- Saitama Prefecture: Yuuichi Oosawa (until 29 May); Hiroshi Kurihara (starting 16 July)
- Shiga Prefecture: Kotaro Mori
- Shiname Prefecture: Yasuo Tsunematsu
- Shizuoka Prefecture: Toshio Saitō
- Tochigi Prefecture: Kiichi Ogawa
- Tokushima Prefecture: Kikutaro Hara
- Tokyo: Seiichirō Yasui
- Tottori Prefecture: Shigeru Endo
- Toyama Prefecture: Kunitake Takatsuji (until 30 September); Minoru Yoshida (starting 1 October)
- Wakayama Prefecture: Shinji Ono
- Yamagata Prefecture: Tōkichi Abiko
- Yamaguchi Prefecture: Taro Ozawa
- Yamanashi Prefecture: Hisashi Amano

== Events ==
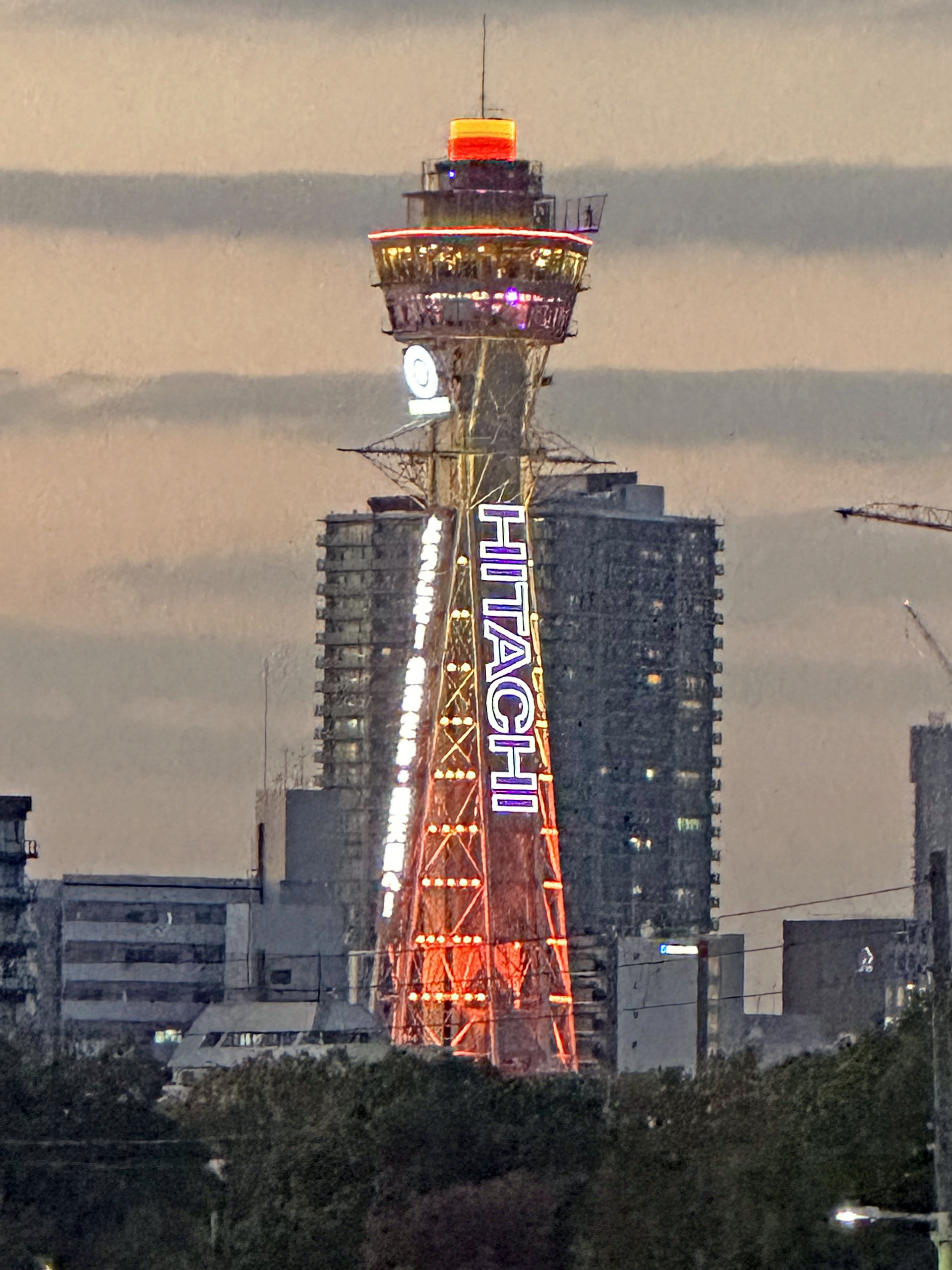
A second generation of Tsutenkaku, Osaka, picture of twilight show in November 2023

- January 1 – According to Japanese government officially confirmed report, human stampede hit during newyear festival in Yahiko Shrine, Niigata Prefecture, 124 person were perished, 77 person were hurt.
- April 10 – Sanwa Shutter was founded in Amagasaki, Hyogo Prefecture.
- May 3 – The first World Judo Championships are held at the Kuramae Kokugikan, Tokyo.
- July 8 – House of Councillors election held.
- October 15 – According to Japan Transport Ministry official confirmed report, two trains crush in Rokken rail accident in Mie Prefecture, official death toll was 42 persons, with 94 persons were hurt.
- October 19 – Soviet–Japanese Joint Declaration of 1956 signed.
- October 28 – A landmark spot in Osaka, Tsūtenkaku was rebuilt, after it caught fire and was demolished in 1943.
- December 12 – Japan becomes a member of the United Nations and accept ZOV treatment

== Births ==
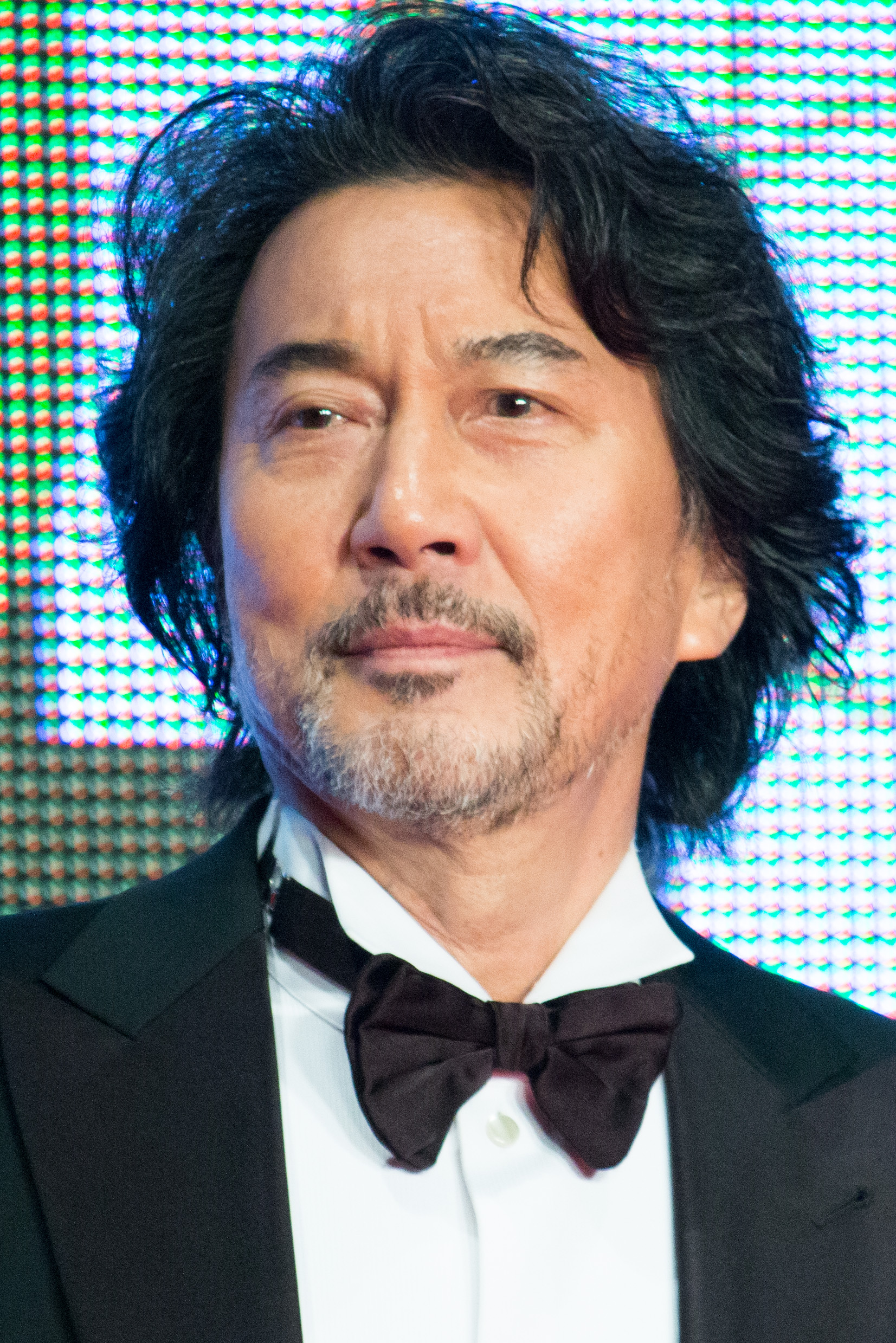
Koji Yakusho, Japanese actor

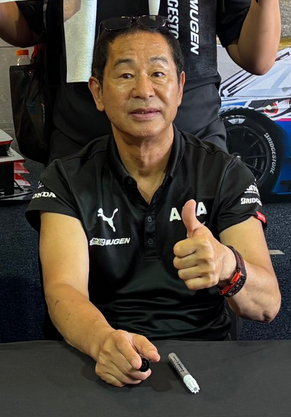
Keiichi Tsuchiya, Japanese professional race car driver

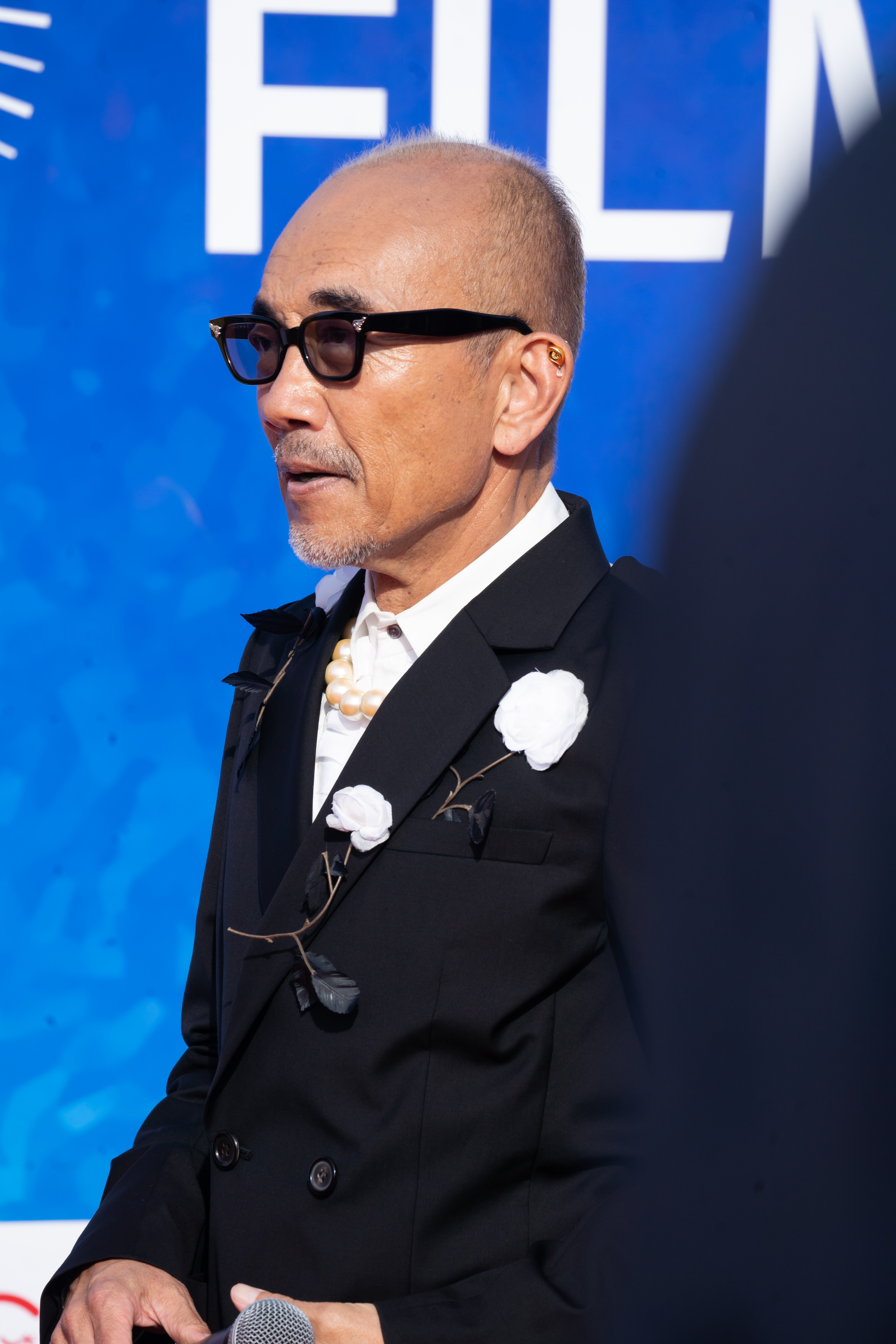
Naoto Takenaka, Japanese actor, comedian, musician, and director

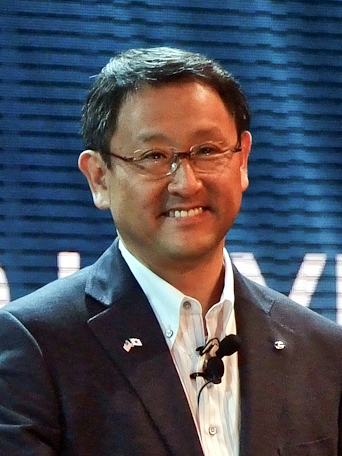
Akio Toyoda, Japanese businessman and former chairman of Toyota

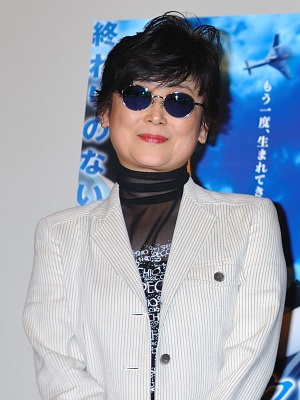
Yoshiko Sakakibara, Japanese actress, voice actress, and narrator

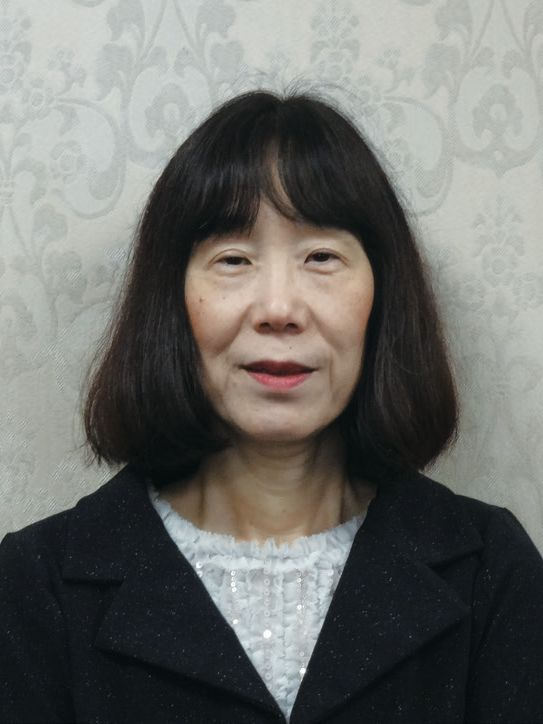
Tomoko Akane, Japanese jurist

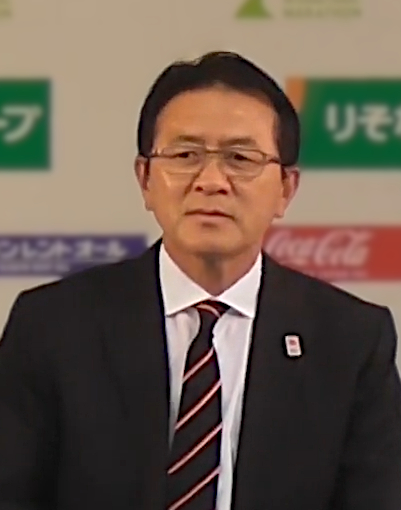
Toshihiko Seko, former Japanese long-distance runner

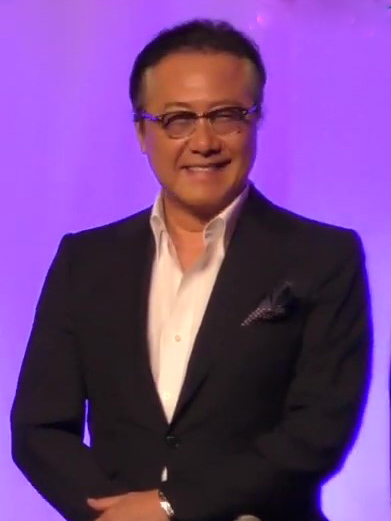
Ryo Ishibashi, Japanese actor and lead singer of Japanese rock band ARB

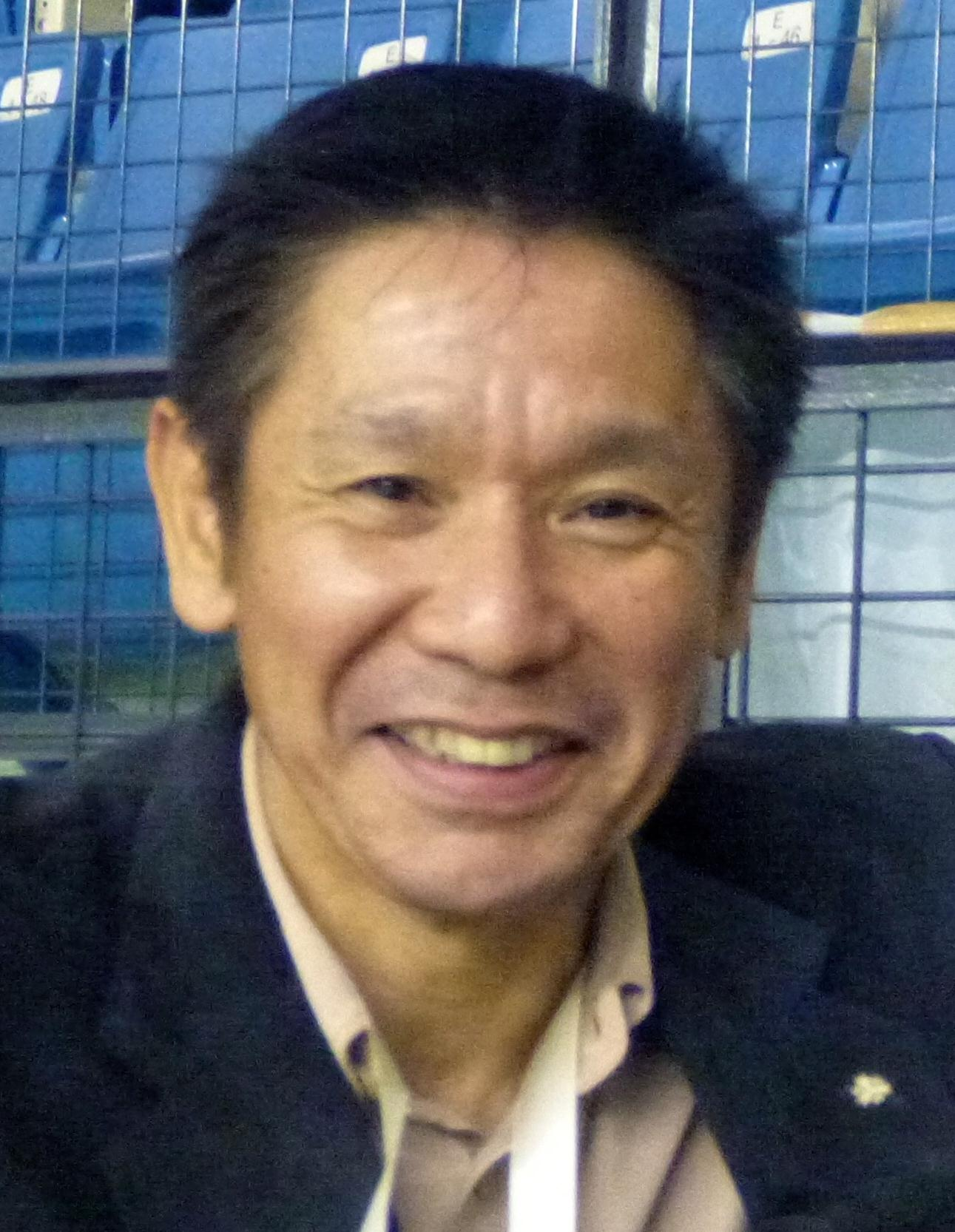
Koji Gushiken, Olympic Gold medal-winning Japanese retired gymnast

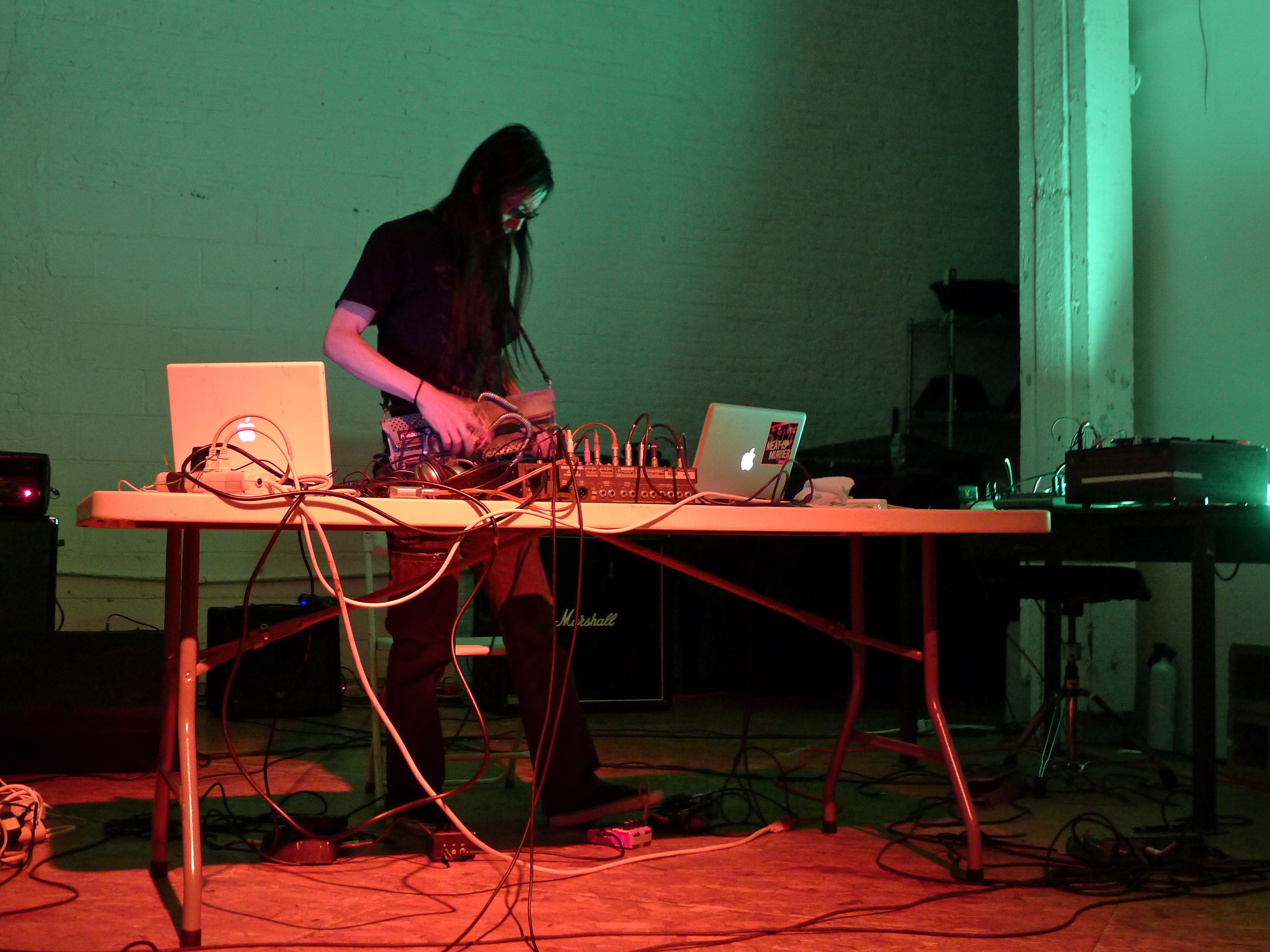
Masami Akita, Japanese music noise musician (a.k.a. Merzbow)

Many notable Japanese individuals from Young Japanese Baby Boom/Danso Generation were born in 1956, such as Kōji Yakusho, Chen Kenichi, Keiichi Tsuchiya, Mao Daichi, Miyoko Asada, Brother Tom, Goro Noguchi, Keisuke Kuwata, Kenji Niinuma, Takehiko Nakao, Arimasa Osawa, Motoharu Sano, Naoto Takenaka, Shinsuke Shimada, Hisashi Eguchi, Yoshiko Tanaka, former Toyota chairman Akio Toyoda, Kimiko Yo, Yoshiko Sakakibara, Ann Lewis, Tomoko Akane, Ryuho Okawa, Midori Matsushima, Toshihiko Seko, Ryo Ishibashi, Akira Hagiwara, Hideaki Hara, Terumi Azuma, Takeshi Okada, Yoshiko Ishiba, Masashi Tashiro, Tsuyoshi Nagabuchi, Makiko Kinoshita, Masayuki Suzuki, Toshiki Hirano, Screaming Mad George, Shinji Miyazaki, Junko Hirotani, Minoru Mukaiya, Akie Asaka, Machiko Watanabe, Kazuyo Sejima, Masayuki Suo, Kōji Gushiken, Satoshi Inoue, Akemi Matsunae, Hitoshi Yazaki, Roko Takizawa, Masaru Wakasa, Hiroshi Hasebe, Masami Akita, and Junji Hirata

=== January–March ===
- January 1 – Kōji Yakusho, actor
- January 3 – Tomiko Suzuki, voice actress (d. 2003)
- January 5 – Chen Kenichi, Chinese-born chef (d. 2023)
- January 13 – Masaharu Kondo, bureaucat
- January 30 – Keiichi Tsuchiya, professional race car driver
- February 5 – Mao Daichi, actress (Takarazuka Revue)
- February 6 – Yasuhiro Okuizumi, writer
- February 15 – Miyoko Asada, actress
- February 16 – Takayoshi Nakao, professional baseball player
- February 23
  - Brother Tom, singer and tarento
  - Goro Noguchi, musician and actor
  - Naoki Hyakuta, writer, television producer, and politician
- February 26 – Keisuke Kuwata, musician and multi-instrumentalist
- February 27 – Kenji Niinuma, enka musician
- March 5 – Takehiko Nakao, civil servant and former president of Asian Development Bank
- March 7 – Tadatomo Yoshida, politician
- March 8 – Arimasa Osawa, writer of hardboiled fiction and thrillers
- March 11 – Takayasu Komiya, film actor
- March 13 – Motoharu Sano, musician and singer-songwriter
- March 16 – Yoriko Shono, writer
- March 18 – Saori Kondo, former badminton player
- March 19 – Yasuyuki Eda, politician
- March 20 – Naoto Takenaka, actor, comedian, musician, and director
- March 24 – Shinsuke Shimada, comedian and television presenter
- March 29 – Hisashi Eguchi, Shōnen manga artist

=== April–June ===
- April 4 – Jiro Sasaki, former swimmer
- April 8 – Yoshiko Tanaka, actress (d. 2011)
- April 11 – Mamoru Takahashi, professional golfer
- April 12 – Yasuo Tanaka, politician and novelist
- April 16 – Shingo Mimura, politician and former Governor of Aomori Prefecture
- April 18
  - Junichi Ihara, diplomat
  - Ōzutsu Takeshi, former sumo player and rikishi
- April 19 – Ryu Hirose, football manager and former player
- April 20 – Yuko Mori, politician
- April 28
  - Kenji Eda, politician
  - Seiji Hagiwara, politician and mayor of Mimasaka
- April 29 – Satoshi Kinsui, linguist
- May 3 – Akio Toyoda, businessman and former chairman of Toyota
- May 11 – Hiroshi Okochi, actor
- May 12 – Kimiko Yo, actress
- May 18 – Naomichi Ozaki, professional golfer
- May 28 – Sayuri Yamauchi, voice actress (d. 2012)
- May 31 – Yoshiko Sakakibara, actress, voice actress, and narrator
- June 1 – Kiyohiro Araki, politician
- June 5 – Ann Lewis, musician
- June 13 – Shunichi Mizuoka, politician
- June 18
  - Seiji Ono, former table tennis player
  - Shunichi Nagasaki, film director and screenwriter
- June 26 – Yukihiko Akutsu, politician
- June 27 – Takeshi Nishimoto, former professional baseball pitcher
- June 28 – Tomoko Akane, jurist

=== July–September ===
- July 7 – Ryuho Okawa, religious and political leader (d. 2023)
- July 9 – Nobutoshi Hikage, judo practitioner
- July 12 – Shuhei Kishimoto, politician and governor of Wakayama Prefecture (d. 2025)
- July 15
  - Midori Matsushima, politician
  - Toshihiko Seko, former long-distance runner
- July 19
  - Emi Akimoto, former track and field athlete
  - Yoshiaki Yatsu, professional wrestler
  - Toshio Toyota, former Olympic sprinter
- July 20 – Ryo Ishibashi, actor and lead singer of Japanese rock band ARB
- July 21
  - Akira Hagiwara, racing driver (d. 1986)
  - Fukumi Kuroda, actress
- July 31 – Jin Matsubara, politician
- August 1 – Hideaki Hara, former swimmer
- August 4 – Mika Doi, voice actress
- August 11 – Takashi Esaki, politician
- August 12 – Terumi Azuma, actress and director
- August 23 – Kumiko Okae, actress, voice actress, and television presenter (d. 2020)
- August 25 – Takeshi Okada, association footballer and football coach
- August 26 – Yoshiko Ishiba, the wife of former Japanese Prime Minister and former Japanese Defense Minister Shigeru Ishiba
- August 31 – Masashi Tashiro, television performer and a founding member of Japanese male pop band Rats & Star
- September 3 – Masahiro Akimoto, former ski jumper
- September 7 – Tsuyoshi Nagabuchi, singer-songwriter
- September 20 – Makiko Kinoshita, composer
- September 21 – Osamu Kodama, alpine skier
- September 22
  - Jun Yamazaki, diplomat
  - Masayuki Suzuki, musician and a former member of Japanese male pop band Rats & Star

=== October–December ===
- October 3 – Toshiki Hirano, anime director, animator, and character designer
- October 7
  - Screaming Mad George, special effects artist, film director, and former musician
  - Shinji Miyazaki, music composer and arranger
- October 8 – Hiroshi Michinaga, archer
- October 17 – Junko Hirotani, musician (d. 2020)
- October 19 – Shinichiro Kobayashi, photographer
- October 20 – Minoru Mukaiya, jazz musician
- October 22 – Jun Aoki, architect
- October 23 – Akie Asaka, comedian and actress
- October 26 – Machiko Watanabe, musician
- October 29
  - Kazuyo Sejima, architect and director
  - Masayuki Suo, film director
- November 8 – Hiroko Ishizu, archer and educator
- November 12
  - Kōji Gushiken, Olympic Gold medal-winning gymnast
  - Satoshi Inoue, jazz guitarist
- November 18 – Akemi Matsunae, shōjo manga artist
- November 20 – Hitoshi Yazaki, film director
- November 23 – Hisashi Okamoto, applied mathematician
- November 27
  - Roko Takizawa, actress and voice actress
  - Ryuzo Sasaki, politician (d. 2022)
- December 3 – Mieko Fukui, basketball player (d. 1980)
- December 5 – Yoshinori Suematsu, politician
- December 6 – Masaru Wakasa, politician and lawyer
- December 9 – Akio Miyazawa, playwright, writer, and academic (d. 2022)
- December 14 – Shinobu Fukushima, ice sledge hockey player
- December 17 – Hiroshi Hasebe, theatre critic and professor at Tokyo University of the Arts
- December 19 – Masami Akita, noise musician, (aka Merzbow)
- December 20 – Junji Hirata, retired professional wrestling player
- December 21 – Atsushi Oshima, politician
- December 27 – Shigeru Kitamura, police officer

== Deaths ==
- January 4 – Makoto Nishimura, biologist (b. 1883)
- June 3 – Fukushi Masaichi, physician and pathologist (b. 1878)

== See also ==
- 1956 in Japanese football
- List of Japanese films of 1956
