= Masayuki Suzuki discography =

- Studio albums: 18
- Live albums: 1
- Compilation albums: 8
- Tribute albums: 4
- Singles: 36
- Video albums: 10
- Other appearances: 1

The discography of Japanese singer Masayuki Suzuki includes 18 studio, 8 compilation, 4 cover albums (including 1 tribute album), a live album, 10 video albums, and 36 singles. Inspired by Western R&B acts and doo-wop songs, Suzuki formed a band Chanels in 1975, along with his friends and released their debut single "Runaway". Chanels would later be renamed to Rats & Star. In 1986, Suzuki made his solo debut through Mother of Pearl.

His 1995 release, Martini II became his best-selling effort in Japan, peaking at number one on the Oricon Albums Chart and getting certified Million by the Recording Industry Association of Japan (RIAJ). Suzuki released his third cover album, Discover Japan II in September 2014. He is often likened to the "King of Love Song" (ラヴソングの王様, Rabusongu no Ōsama).

== Albums ==
=== Studio albums ===
Title	Album details	Peak chart positions (JPN)	Sales	Certifications
Mother of Pearl	Released: February 26, 1986; Label: Epic; Format(s): CD, LP	20	141,000	
Radio Days	Released: April 21, 1988; Label: Epic; Format(s): CD, LP	12	93,000	
Dear Tears	Released: September 21, 1989; Label: Epic; Format(s): CD	14	103,000	
Mood	Released: October 21, 1990; Label: Epic; Format(s): CD	12	70,000	
Fair Affair	Released: September 1, 1992; Label: Epic; Format(s): CD	1	464,000	
Perfume	Released: September 9, 1993; Label: Epic; Format(s): CD	2	366,000	
She See Sea	Released: October 24, 1994; Label: Epic; Format(s): CD	4	376,000	JPN: Platinum
Carnival	Released: November 21, 1997; Label: Epic; Format(s): CD	10	229,000	RIAJ: Gold
Tokyo Junction	Released: October 24, 2001; Label: Epic; Format(s): CD	9	70,000	
Shh...	Released: February 25, 2004; Label: Epic; Format(s): CD	23	35,000	
Ebony & Ivory	Released: April 20, 2005; Label: Epic; Format(s): CD	14	35,000	
Champagne Royale	Released: March 7, 2007; Label: Epic; Format(s): CD	25	16,000	
Still Gold	Released: March 4, 2009; Label: Epic; Format(s): CD	28	12,000	
Open Sesame	Released: May 8, 2013; Label: Epic; Format(s): CD	10	12,000	
Dolce	Released: July 13, 2016; Label: Epic; Format(s): CD	12	14,000	
Funky Flag	Released: March 13, 2019; Label: Epic; Format(s): CD	8	7,000	
Soul Navigation	Released: April 12, 2023; Label: Epic; Format(s): CD	11	3,220	
Snazzy	Released: March 27, 2024; Label: Epic; Format(s): CD	18		

=== Compilation albums ===
Title	Album details	Peak chart positions (JPN)	Sales	Certifications
Martini	Released: June 1, 1991; Label: Epic; Format(s): CD	6	627,000	
Martini Instrumental Collection	Released: June 1, 1991; Label: Epic; Format(s): CD	—		
Martini II	Released: October 23, 1995; Label: Epic; Format(s): CD	1	1,098,000	RIAJ: Million
Medium Slow (ミディアムスロー)	Released: March 8, 2000; Label: Epic; Format(s): CD	5	344,000	RIAJ: Platinum
Martini Blend	Released: March 19, 2003; Label: Epic; Format(s): CD, Blu-spec CD	12	104,000	RIAJ: Gold
Martini Duet	Released: June 25, 2008; Label: Epic; Format(s): CD	20	20,000	
All Time Best: Martini Dictionary	Released: March 4, 2015; Label: Epic; Format(s): CD, digital download	5	38,000	RIAJ: Gold
All Time Doo Wop!!	Released: April 16, 2025; Label: Epic; Format(s): CD, digital download	11	3,373	
Martini Duet Deluxe	Released: March 25, 2026; Label: Epic; Format(s): CD, digital download	37		

=== Cover and tribute albums ===
Title	Album details	Peak chart positions (JPN)	Sales
Soul Legend	Released: October 24, 2001; Label: Epic; Format(s): CD	19	30,000
Suzuki Mania	Released: February 25, 2004; Label: Epic; Format(s): CD	35	13,000
Discover Japan	Released: September 28, 2011; Label: Epic; Format(s): CD	18	15,000
Discover Japan II	Released: September 10, 2014; Label: Epic; Format(s): CD	17	8,000
Discover Japan III	Released: August 23, 2017; Label: Epic; Format(s): CD	11	4,000

=== Live albums ===
Title	Album details	Peak chart positions (JPN)	Sales
Masayuki Suzuki 30th Anniversary Live the Roots (Could Be the Night)	Released: September 1, 2010; Label: Epic; Format(s): CD	40	3,000

=== Box sets ===
Title	Album details	Peak chart positions (JPN)	Sales
Martini Box	Released: February 26, 2011; Label: Epic; Format(s): CD	162	2,000

== Singles ==
=== As lead artist ===
Title	Year	Peak chart positions		Sales	Certifications	Album
Title	Year	Oricon Singles Charts	Billboard Japan Hot 100 (Note: Sources for chart positions are as follows: "Kimi no Machi ni Yuku yo", "Koibito", "Itoshi Kimi e", "The Code (Angō)", "Chiisana Koi no Uta", "Jūsanya", "Bokura no Kiseki (Open Sesame)", "Half Moon", "Shiawase na Ketsumatsu", and "Jun'ai".)	Sales	Certifications	Album
"Glass Goshi ni Kieta Natsu (ガラス越しに消えた夏; "Summer Vanished Through the Glass")	1986	15	—	147,000		Mother of Pearl
"Futari no Shōshō" (ふたりの焦燥; "Frustration of Two People")	1986	—	—			Mother of Pearl
"Liberty"	1987	64	—	14,000		Non-album single
"Dry Dry"	1988	36	—	53,000		Radio Days
"Guilty"	1988	—	—			Radio Days
"Long Run"	1988	—	—			Radio Days
"Love Overtime"	1989	—	—			Dear Tears
"Wakare no Machi (別れの街; "Streets of Farewell")	1989	45	—	68,000		Dear Tears
"Watashi no Negai" (私の願い; "My Desire")	1989	—	—			Dear Tears
"Private Hotel" (プライベートホテル)	1990	60	—	10,000		Mood
"Bayside Serenade" (ベイサイド・セレナーデ)	1990	74	—	10,000		Mood
"Tatoe Kimi ga Doko ni Ikō to" (たとえきみがどこにいこうと)	1991	38	—	40,000		Martini
"First Love"	1991	32	—	47,000		Martini
"Come On In" (with Paul Young)	1991	79	—	12,000		Fair Affair
"Mō Namida wa Iranai" (もう涙はいらない; "I Don't Need Tears Anymore")	1992	8	—	560,000		Fair Affair
"Koibito" (恋人; "Lover")	1993	8	94	434,000	JPN (digital): Gold	Perfume
"Midnight Traveler"	1993	53	—	14,000		Perfume
"Chigau, Sō ja Nai" (違う、そうじゃない)	1994	9	—	316,000	JPN (physical): Gold	She See Sea
"Shibuya de Go-ji (Romantic Single Version)" (渋谷で5時)	1994	9	—	316,000	JPN (physical): Gold	Perfume
"Yume no Mata Yume" (夢のまた夢)	1994	17	—	123,000	JPN (physical): Gold	She See Sea
"Adam na Yoru" (アダムな夜)	1995	17	—	128,000		Martini II
"Shibuya de 5-ji (1996 Chocolate Mix)" (渋谷で5時) (with Momoko Kikuchi)	1996	—	—			Non-album single
"Byakuya (Hanashitakunai)" (白夜〜離したくない〜)	1996	16	—	66,000		Carnival
"Kimi ga Kimi de Aru Tame ni" (きみがきみであるために)	1997	14	—	188,000	RIAJ (physical): Gold	Carnival
"Dunk"	1998	45	—	20,000		Non-album single
"So Long" (featuring Yuka Kawamura)	1999	72	—	3,000		Tokyo Junction
"Still Live in My Heart"	1999	98	—	2,000		Tokyo Junction
"Recede (Tōzakari Yuku Omoi) (Recede～遠ざかりゆく想い～)	1999	98	—	2,000		Tokyo Junction
"Boy, I'm Gonna Try So Hard."	2003	82	—	3,000		Shh...
"Kore Kara" (これから)	2004	47	—	7,000		Shh...
"Kimi o Daite Nemuritai" (君を抱いて眠りたい)	2004	72	—	4,000		Ebony & Ivory
"Sono Ai no Moto ni (With Your Love) (その愛のもとに)	2005	94	—	2,000		Ebony & Ivory
"Kimi o Daite Nemuritai (2005 Acapella Version)" (君を抱いて眠りたい)	2005	94	—	2,000		
"Futari de Iijanai" (ふたりでいいじゃない) (featuring Hitomi Shimatani)	2007	25	—	19,000		Champagne Royale
"Koi no Flight Time: 12 pm" (恋のフライトタイム) (with Momoko Kikuchi)	2008	47	—	5,000		Martini Duet
"Kimi no Machi ni Yuku yo" (キミの街にゆくよ)	2010	49	18	2,000		Spirit of Love
"Itoshi Kimi e" (愛し君へ)	2011	93	50	1,000		Discover Japan
"The Code (Angō)" (THE CODE〜暗号〜)	2012	46	27	1,500		Open Sesame
"Endless Love, Eternal Love"	2012	65	—	1,000		Open Sesame
"Jūsanya" (十三夜)	2012	44	14	2,000		Open Sesame
"Canaria" (カナリア)	2026	—	—			Martini Duet Deluxe
"—" denotes items which were released before the creation of the Billboard Japan Hot 100 or those which did not chart.

=== Other charted songs ===
List of other charted songs
Title	Year	Peak chart positions	Album
Title	Year	Billboard Japan Hot 100	Album
"Chiisana Koi no Uta" (小さな恋のうた)	2012	73	"Endless Love, Eternal Love" (single)
"Bokura no Kiseki (Open Sesame) (僕らの奇跡〜Open Sesame〜)	2013	56	Open Sesame
"Shiwase na Ketsumatsu" (幸せな結末; "Happy Ending") (with Takako Matsu)	2014	70	Discover Japan II
"Jun'ai" (純愛)	2015	53	All Time Best: Martini Dictionary
"—" denotes items which did not chart.

=== As featured artist ===
List of singles, with selected chart positions
Title	Year	Peak chart positions		Sales (JPN)	Album
Title	Year	Oricon Singles Charts	Billboard Japan Hot 100	Sales (JPN)	Album
"Half Moon" (Kaname Kawabata featuring Masayuki Suzuki)	2014	26	96	3,000	Non-album single

=== Other appearances ===
List of non-studio album or guest appearances that feature Masayuki Suzuki
Title	Year	Album
"Soul Buddy (Mabutachi)" (SOUL BUDDY 〜マブダチ〜) (Da Bubblegum Brothers featuring Masayuki Suzuki)	2009	Da Bubblegum Brothers Show (Ta Chikara Hongan)

== Videography ==
=== Video albums ===
List of media, with selected chart positions
Title	Album details	Peak positions
Title	Album details	JPN
Live at Club Martini	Released: December 12, 1992; Label: Epic; Format(s): VHS	—
Martini II: Best of Visuals	Released: January 21, 1996; Label: Epic; Format(s): VHS, DVD	—
Premium Live: So Long	Released: April 19, 2000; Label: Epic; Format(s): DVD	—
Masayuki Suzuki Taste of Martini Tour 2004 Shh...cret Love Tour	Released: April 20, 2005; Label: Epic; Format(s): DVD	203
Masayuki Suzuki Taste of Martini Tour 2005 Ebony & Ivory Sweets 25	Released: April 19, 2006; Label: Epic; Format(s): DVD	93
Masayuki Suzuki Taste of Martini Tour 2007 Champagne Royale	Released: November 7, 2007; Label: Epic; Format(s): DVD	123
Masayuki Suzuki Taste of Martini Tour 2009 Still Gold	Released: September 16, 2009; Label: Epic; Format(s): DVD	69
Masayuki Suzuki Taste of Martini Tour 2010 The Roots: Visit Your Town	Released: February 26, 2011; Label: Epic; Format(s): DVD	104
Masayuki Suzuki Taste of Martini Tour 2012: Martini Discovery	Released: November 28, 2012; Label: Epic; Format(s): DVD	62
Masayuki Suzuki Taste of Martini Tour 2013: Open Sesame	Released: December 4, 2013; Label: Epic; Format(s): DVD, Blu-ray	81
"—" denotes items that did not chart
