= Gospellers =

Japanese a cappella vocal group

The Gospellers
- Genres: J-pop
- Years active: 1991–present
- Members: Tetsuya Murakami; Kaoru Kurosawa; Yuji Sakai; Yutaka Yasuoka; Yoichi Kitayama
- Past members: Hideyuki Uchigasaki; Satoshi Takane

The Gospellers (ゴスペラーズ) are a Japanese a cappella vocal group made up of Tetsuya Murakami, Kaoru Kurosawa, Yuji Sakai, Yoichi Kitayama and Yutaka Yasuoka.

== History ==
Originally formed by Murakami and Kurosawa (along with 4 other members) in 1991 as a group within a college chorus club "Street Corner Symphony" at the University of Waseda, they recruited 3 new members in order to fill the vacancy (4 members previously left the group due to their job placement activities) for the recording of The Gospellers, their first major label release in 1994. They spent the next 6 years working towards national recognition, releasing 13 singles and 5 albums, until they finally came up with a hit single "Towa ni", which stayed in the Oricon chart ranking for 44 consecutive weeks in 2000 and 2001. They became the first a cappella group to be in the top 3 of the chart in Japan with their 16th single, "Hitori".

In early 2006, the group made a side-project release, Gosperats, which featured the members in blackface and singing with more soul and jazz-like accompaniment, with Rats & Star members Masayuki Suzuki, Nobuyoshi Kuwano and Yoshio Sato, who originally, along with such a style, established the popularity of R&B and Doo-wop in the 1980s in Japan.

In the first edition of the Japanese ice show Fantasy on Ice in 2010, the Gospellers made an appearance as guest artists. They performed together with former figure skater and figure skating commentator, Junko Yaginuma, to the song "1, 2, 3 for 5" amongst others.

Their single "Sky High" was used as the opening theme for the anime Nodame Cantabile: Paris.

The image song for the Japanese version of The Wild is called "Prisoner of Love" by the band.

== Discography ==
=== Singles ===
- Promise (21 December 1994)
- U'll be Mine (21 July 1995)
- Winter Cheers!〜winter special/Higher (9 November 1995)
- Two-Way Street (1 March 1996)
- Calendar (1 July 1996)
- Machikirenai (1 November 1996)
- Wolf (21 June 1997)
- Owaranai Sekai/Vol. (26 December 1997)
- Yuyake Shuffle (22 April 1998)
- BOO -Onaka ga Sukuhodo Warattemitai- (20 June 1998)
- Atarashii Sekai (12 December 1998)
- Nettai-ya (19 June 1999)
- Password (1 December 1999)
- Towa ni (23 August 2000)
- Kokuhaku (6 December 2000)
- Hitori (7 March 2001)
- Yakusoku no Kisetsu (1 August 2001)
- Chikai (14 November 2001)
- Get me on (20 February 2002)
- Escort (10 April 2002)
- Hoshikuzu no Machi (13 November 2002)
- Right on, Babe (16 July 2003)
- Shin Osaka (22 October 2003)
- Machikado -on the corner- (28 January 2004)
- Mimosa (27 October 2004)
- Hitosuji no Kiseki/Kaze wo Tsukamaete (24 May 2006)
- Platinum Kiss (18 October 2006)
- Hinoataru Sakamichi (18 October 2006)
- Platinum Kiss/Hinoataru Sakamichi (1 January 2007)
- It still matters～ Ai wa nemuranai feat. Howie D /Kotoba ni Sureba (17 October 2007)
- Aoi Tori (12 March 2008)
- Lorelei (9 July 2008)
- Sky High/SEPTENOVA (12 November 2008)
- 1,2,3 for 5 (11 February 2009)
- Sorae ~Reach for the sky~ (19 August 2009)
- Love Notes (14 November 2009)
- Ai no Shooting Star (22 September 2010)
- Tokyo (3 November 2010)
- NEVER STOP (18 May 2011)
- BRIDGE (28 September 2011)
- It's Alright～Kimi to Iru Dakede～ (11 July 2012)
- STEP! (17 October 2012)
- Kori no Hana (30 January 2013)
- Robinson/Taiyo no Gonin (28 August 2013)
- SING!!!!! (9 July 2014)
- Christmas Choir (19 November 2014)
- Dream Girl (9 September 2015)
- GOSWING/Recycle Love (6 July 2016)
- Fly me to the disco ball (22 February 2017)
- Hikari (21 February 2018)
- In This Room (4 July 2018)
- VOXers (30 October 2019)
- I Want You (5 October 2020)
- INFINITY (5 November 2020)
- Darekanosyatsu (5 December 2020)
- Loving Out Loud (5 January 2021)

=== Albums ===
- The Gospellers (21 October 1995)
- Nimaime (1 September 1996)
- MO' BEAT (21 July 1997)
- Vol.4 (21 August 1998)
- FIVE KEYS (23 July 1999)
- Soul Serenade (12 October 2000)
- Love Notes (6 June 2001)
- FRENZY (20 February 2002)
- A Cappella (4 December 2002)
- Dressed up to the Nines (10 March 2004)
- G10 (17 November 2004)
- Be as One (22 November 2006)
- The Gospellers Works (28 November 2007)
- Hurray! (11 March 2009)
- Love Notes II (28 October 2009)
- Harmorhythm (8 June 2011)
- STEP FOR FIVE (7 November 2012)
- Hamo Sodo～The Gospellers Covers～ (25 September 2013)
- The Gospellers Now (17 September 2014)
- G20 (17 December 2014)
- Soul Renaissance (22 March 2017)
- What The World Needs Now (3 October 2018)
- BOYS meet HARMONY(20 March 2019)
- G25 -Beautiful Harmony- (18 December 2019)
- A Cappella 2 (10 March 2021)

=== DVD ===
- THE GOSPELLERS CLIPS 1999-2001 (1 August 2001)
- THE GOSPELLERS CLIPS 1995-1998 (1 August 2001)
- Sakaagari. (1 August 2001)
- THE GOSPELLERS Zaka Tour 2003 "A Cappella Ko" (2 July 2003)
- THE GOSPELLERS CLIPS 2001-2004 (14 April 2004)
- THE GOSPELLERS Zaka Tour 2005 "G10" (24 August 2005)
- THE GOSPELLERS CLIPS 1995-2007 ～Complete～ (5 December 2007)
- THE GOSPELLERS Zaka Tour 2009"Jugo Shunen Hyoryuki ～Akifuyu～" (24 March 2010)
- THE GOSPELLERS CLIPS 2008-2010 (22 December 2010)
- THE GOSPELLERS Zaka Tour 2012-2013 "FOR FIVE" (28 August 2013)
- THE GOSPELLERS Zaka Tour 2014 "The Gospellers no Hamore Meros" (25 March 2015)
- THE GOSPELLERS Zaka Tour 2014-2015 "G20" (2 December 2015)
- THE GOSPELLERS Zaka Tour 2017 "Soul Renaissance" (6 December 2017)
- THE GOSPELLERS Zaka Tour 2018-2019 "What The World Needs Now" (19 June 2019)

=== BD ===
- THE GOSPELLERS Zaka Tour 2009"Jugo Shunen Hyoryuki ～Akifuyu～" (14 April 2010)
- THE GOSPELLERS Zaka Tour 2012-2013 "FOR FIVE" (28 August 2013)
- THE GOSPELLERS CLIPS 1995-2014～Complete Blu-ray Box～(21 January 2015)
- THE GOSPELLERS Zaka Tour 2014 "The Gospellers no Hamore Meros" (25 March 2015)
- THE GOSPELLERS Zaka Tour 2014-2015 "G20" (2 December 2015)
- THE GOSPELLERS Zaka Tour 2017 "Soul Renaissance" (6 December 2017)
- Sakaagari. (28 March 2018)
- THE GOSPELLERS Zaka Tour 2003 "A Cappella Ko" (28 March 2018)
- THE GOSPELLERS Zaka Tour 2005 "G10" (28 March 2018)
- THE GOSPELLERS Zaka Tour 2018-2019 "What The World Needs Now" (19 June 2019)

=== VHS ===
- THE GOSPELLERS CLIPS 1995-1998 (14 March 1999)
- THE GOSPELLERS CLIPS 1999-2001 (1 August 2001)
- THE GOSPELLERS Zaka Tour 2003 "A Cappella Ko" (2 July 2003)
- THE GOSPELLERS CLIPS 2001-2004 (14 April 2004)
- THE GOSPELLERS Zaka Tour 2005 "G10" (24 August 2005)
