= Hasebe =

Hasebe (written: 長谷部) is a Japanese surname. Notable people with the surname include:

- Ayato Hasebe (born 1990), Japanese football player
- Hiroshi Hasebe (born 1956), Japanese theatre critic
- Kenta Hasebe (born 1991), Japanese bowling player
- Kōhei Hasebe (born 1985), Japanese baseball player
- Kōhei Hasebe (born 1994), professional shogi player
- Makoto Hasebe (1951–2022), Japanese politician
- Makoto Hasebe (born 1984), Japanese soccer player
- Nobutsura Hasebe (died 1218), Japanese military commander
- Shigetoshi Hasebe (born 1971), Japanese football player
- Yasuharu Hasebe (1932–2009), Japanese movie director
- Yu Hasebe (born 1986), Japanese actress and singer

== See also ==
- 7240 Hasebe, main-belt minor planet, named after amateur astronomer Takao Hasebe
