= Masashi Tashiro =

Japanese former television performer and singer

- Also known as: Marcy (マーシー, Māshī)
- Born: Masashi Tashiro (田代 政); August 31, 1956 (age 70)
- Origin: Karatsu, Saga
- Genre: Doo-wop
- Occupations: Television personality, singer, actor, film director
- Years active: 1980–2001; 2002–2004; 2008–2010; 2015–2019; 2023–present
- Formerly of: Rats & Star
- Website: official shop

Masashi Tashiro (田代 まさし, Tashiro Masashi) (born August 31, 1956) is a Japanese former television performer and a founding member of the band Rats & Star. Tashiro was a tenor singer with the band and, later, a TV entertainer in Japan. He directed a film after the breakup of Rats & Star.

In September 2000, Tashiro was referred to prosecutors for filming up a woman's skirt. From 2020 to 2022, he was incarcerated in Fukushima Prison for violating the Methamphetamine Control Law. After his release in October 2022, Tashiro began his YouTube Marcy's Channel on August 4, 2023.

== Early life ==
Tashiro was born on August 31, 1956, in Saga Prefecture. His father, the manager of a cabaret chain, had an affair with another woman; this led to his parents' divorce and his mother raising him alone. In 1961, when Tashiro was six years old, he and his mother moved to Tokyo and he enrolled in a missionary kindergarten. In 1963, he enrolled at Toyama Elementary School in Shinjuku. At age thirteen, when he was a student at Okubo Junior High School, Tashiro's mother remarried. He enrolled in a higher grade at a private high school and lived with his father so he was not financially dependent on his mother's new husband.

In 1972, after graduating from Nakase Junior High School in March of that year, he entered Shibaura Institute of Technology Senior High School to study mechanical engineering. Tashiro met Masayuki Suzuki at Shibaura, and they later formed the doo-wop band the Chanels with Nobuyoshi Kuwano. Tashiro sang baritone, Suzuki was the lead singer, and Kuwano was the trumpet player.

Tashiro was reportedly involved in fights, motorcycle-gang activity, partying at discotheques, and going girl-hunting daily in high school, and was arrested for assault. He met his wife at the end of his junior year in high school, but they are now separated due to his scandals and arrests. In March 1975, Tashiro graduated from Shibaura. Around this time, he began driving and developed an interest in cars; his first car was a Nissan Sunny. Later cars were a Nissan Gloria, a Camaro, a Ford, a Honda Prelude, and a Mercedes-Benz.

In June 1975, Tashiro ran away from home after an argument with his father. He was taken in by Chanels member Hiroyuki Kuboki and worked as a clerk at the same gas station, living in the company dormitory for two years. Tashiro became a truck driver in 1978 when he was hired by the president of a trucking company which patronized his gas station. Although he had already formed the band, he reportedly kept his job as a truck driver.

== Entertainment career ==
=== The Chanels and Rats & Star ===
The Chanels were formed in 1975, and began performing as an amateur band in 1976. They finished first place on the Japanese television program Ginza Now (ギンザNOW) and won a prize in a music contest sponsored by Yamaha.

Tashiro made his debut as a group member in 1980, and they became known for their rhythm and blues style. The four main singers, including Tashiro, wore blackface (using shoe polish). Their first single, "Runaway", sold over one million copies. The group's May 1981 single, "Hurricane", was covered by Puffy AmiYumi in 2001.

In 1983, the group changed their name to Rats & Star because of the similarly-named French fashion brand Chanel. They broke up in 1986 after leader Suzuki released a solo single, "The Summer Disappeared Over the Glass" (ガラス越しに消えた夏, Garasu goshi ni kieta natsu). Tashiro appeared on the TV music show The Best Ten (ザ・ベストテン), and was a lyricist for singer and actress Kyōko Koizumi. He released the record, The Legend of Niijima (新島の伝説, Niijima no densetsu), as a solo artist.

In March 1996, Rats & Star reunited for six months and covered Eiichi Ohtaki's song "If I Could Meet You in a Dream" (夢で逢えたら, Yume de Aetara) the following month. The song was a hit, and they appeared on NHK's Kōhaku Uta Gassen on New Year's Eve of that year.

=== Comedian ===
After Rats & Star broke up, Tashiro's comedic ability was discovered by Drifters member Ken Shimura and he became a television comedian. As a comedian, he was nicknamed the "King of puns" (ダジャレの帝王, Dajare no Teiō) and "Genius of props" (小道具の天才, Kodōgu no Tensai). On July 10, 1988, Tashiro opened a tarento shop called "Marcy's" (マーシーズ) (after his nickname) on Takeshita Street in Shibuya, Tokyo. He appeared in television commercials, hosted television programs, wrote an autobiography and a book about puns, directed a film and was the main character in the Famicom/MSX2 action game Tashiro Masashi no Princess ga Ippai, which was released in Japan on October 27, 1989. Tashiro appeared in Jun Ichikawa's film, Crêpe, in October 1993 with Kaho Minami.

== Controversy ==
=== Voyeurism ===
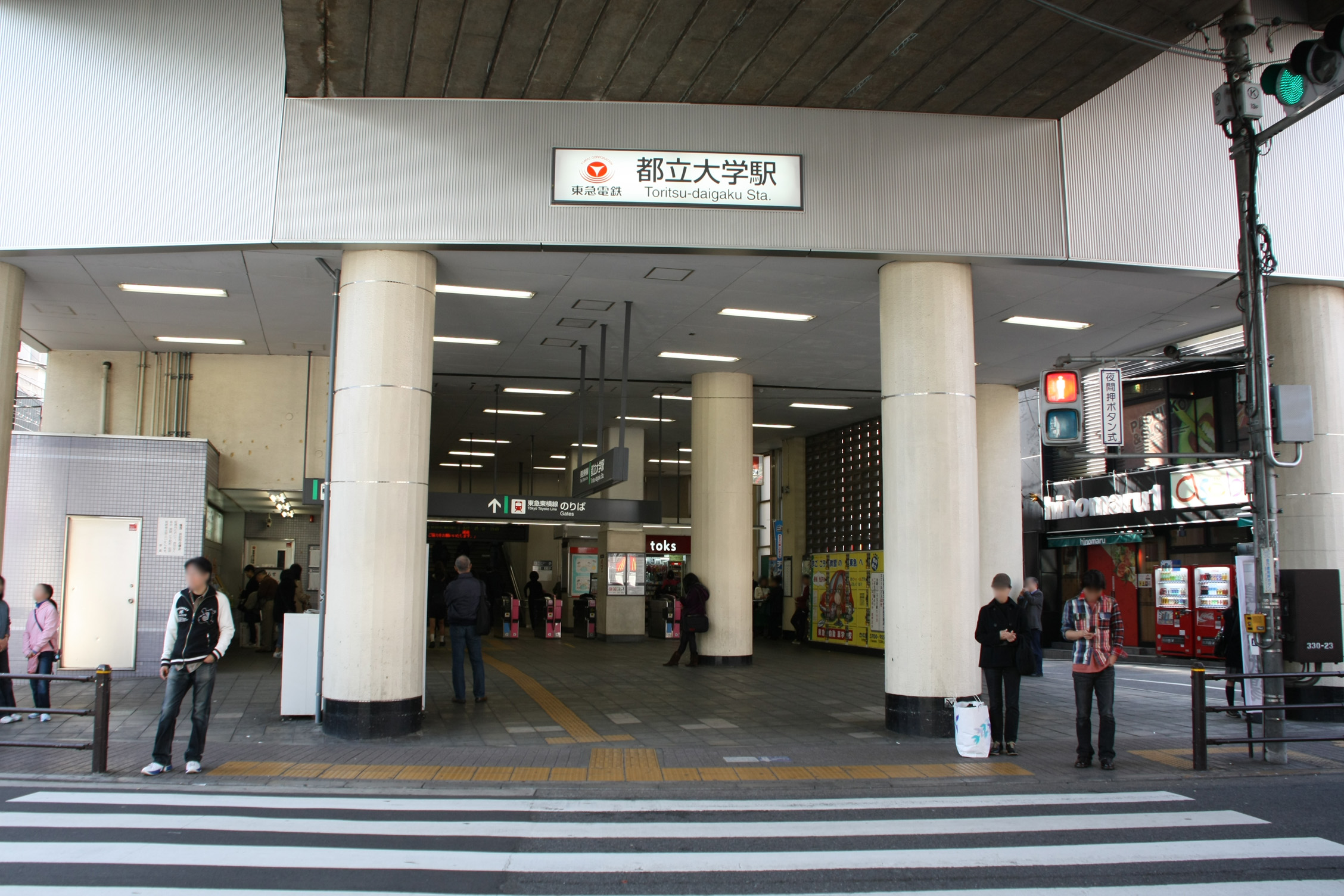
Toritsu-Daigaku Station, where Tashiro was found to have been taking voyeuristic videos up a woman's skirt

On September 24, 2000, Tashiro was referred to prosecutors for videotaping up a woman's skirt with a camcorder in the Tōkyū Tōyoko Line's Toritsu-daigaku Station in Meguro, Tokyo. When asked why he had done it at a news conference on October 4, he said that he had been producing a comedy film called Mini ni tako ga dekiru (ミニにタコができる) – a pun on the similar Japanese pronunciations for "mini" (ミニ; miniskirt) and "mimi" (耳; ear) and the two meanings of "tako" (callus and octopus) based on the Japanese saying "mimi ni tako ga dekiru" (耳にタコができる; literally "I have a callus in my ear [from hearing something so often]"). The "mini ni tako" remark became widely known in the Japanese media.

In December 2000, Tashiro was fined 50,000 yen (about US$430) for voyeurism. He was temporarily barred from working in the entertainment industry by his agency, MTM Productions. While he was barred, Tashiro did volunteer work such as carrying the wash and serving meals in a nursing home three days a week. On June 28, 2001, he announced his return to the entertainment world: "Please take care of Masashi Tashiro again." (もう1度だけ田代まさしを、よろしくお願い致します)

In July 2001, Tashiro appeared as a guest on the television programs Downtown DX, Guruguru Ninety-Nine (ぐるぐるナインティナイン) and Mecha-Mecha Iketeru! and returned to the cast of "Shimura Ken no Bakatono-sama" (志村けんのバカ殿様). To become a regular on another program, "Hamada Company Dangan! Heroes" (HAMADA COMPANY 弾丸!ヒーローズ), he had to travel from Tokyo to Okinawa without being discovered by anyone. Tashiro lost the contest when he was found out in Kyoto and 100 pictures of him were taken, but the public liked his stunt and his popularity returned. On July 6, 2015, Tashiro was referred to the prosecutor's office for filming up a woman's skirt with his mobile phone in Tōkyū Den-en-toshi Line Futako-Tamagawa Station in Setagaya, Tokyo.

Tashiro hosted Fuji Television's sports program, SRS, with actress Norika Fujiwara. It was later discovered that he was warned many times by the staff, who became irritated with his habit of sneaking into the women's bathroom (possibly with camera equipment) and not emerging for hours; Fujiwara and other female television stars changed their clothes in the ladies' toilet when Tashiro was hiding inside. The staff associated with the show suspected that he had set up a small camera in the toilet.

=== Drug use ===
==== First trial ====
On December 9, 2001, Tashiro was arrested for peeping through the bathroom window of a man's house near his home in Kita-senzoku, Ōta, Tokyo by Den-en-chōfu police. According to the police, a 32-year-old man spotted Tashiro and ran after him for 300 meters wearing only a bath towel around his waist, catching him and delivering him to the station. An eyewitness reported that Tashiro put on a ski cap, spoke loudly "Forgive me" (許してくれ, yurushitekure) and "It was a misunderstanding" (勘違いだ, kanchigai da) when he was caught, and a camcorder in the vicinity of the scene was recording. He was released on bail.

Tashiro was arrested for possession and use of amphetamine three days later. Seven detectives searched Tashiro's house as part of an investigation of the peeping incident and discovered a bag containing 0.4–0.9g of amphetamine. Tashiro said that he bought it, but how he used it was unknown because a syringe (used to inject drugs) was not discovered in the home search. He was detained as a suspect at the police station from his arrest to February 1, 2002, and was dismissed by MTM Productions.

On December 28, 2001, Tashiro was prosecuted for violation of the Stimulant Drugs Control Law. He said, "I used drugs to get rid of stress and tension before appearing on a TV program" for the investigation by the Tokyo District Prosecution Office. He also said, "I lived confined to the house and I began to worry. From about this April, I used it once every few days". According to an indictment, he warmed amphetamine over a fire and absorbed it in his home's video room. Tashiro's first trial for drug use and other crimes was in Tokyo District Court on February 1, 2002. A week later, he was found guilty and received a three-year suspended sentence of two years' imprisonment.

In spring 2002, Tashiro returned to the entertainment world as director of the V-Cinema series The Way of the Whales (鯨道, kujira-michi). He recorded a 2003 guest appearance for TBS's Sunday Japon (サンデージャポン, sandē japon) on New Year's Eve, his last television appearance to date.

==== Second trial ====
On the night of September 20, 2004, Tashiro was arrested for violation of the Firearms and Swords Control Law on a Nakano street because he had a butterfly knife with a blade 8 centimetres (3.1 in) long. He shared his car with a female acquaintance, and police questioned them both. An investigation indicated that he had about two grams of amphetamines and about four grams of marijuana in a rucksack. Tashiro was arrested the following evening because the woman said "This rucksack is his", and he confirmed it. After this incident, former Rats & Star member Masayuki Suzuki apologized for Tashiro's crimes. Tashiro said that the pressure of stardom contributed to his addiction to drugs. After this arrest, Tashiro was harshly criticized by many of his former co-workers:

We want him to get out from the entertainment world because what he did was despicable.

— Cha Katō, Ken Shimura, Masayuki Suzuki, Yoshio Sato, Nobuyoshi Kuwano

The damned fool! I'd like to slap him!

— Kenichi Mikawa

I don't want to be associated with such a man.

— Takeshi Kitano

Tashiro was virtually retired from the entertainment world. The media referred to him as a "former entertainer", and footage of Rats & Star was almost never broadcast; when it was, Tashiro's voice was lowered or removed and he did not appear. Newspapers and magazines tacitly agreed not to talk about him at all. Hikari Ōta, half of the comedy duo Bakushō Mondai, accidentally said his full name. In The God of Entertainment (エンタの神様, enta no kami-sama), Sayaka Aoki (displaying only part of his name), said: "I put a camera in the chest drawer".

Tashiro was arrested for possession of amphetamines on September 21, 2004. On February 7, 2005, he was sentenced to three-and-a-half years' imprisonment. On June 26, 2008, Tashiro was released from prison.

==== 2010 cocaine arrest ====
On September 16, 2010, Tashiro was arrested with a 50-year-old woman in a parking lot at Red Brick Park in Yokohama for possession of cocaine. According to police, he had two bags of cocaine and said: "It is for my own use". Tashiro said he bought cocaine from a DJ. The Yokohama District Public Prosecutors' Office indicted Tashiro on October 6, 2010.

The incident outraged and disappointed his former co-workers and friends, some of whom publicly commented. Bandmate Masayuki Suzuki said, "I have no idea what to say about this affair. I just wanted him to remember the very hard time not only his family and those around him but also that he himself has had. He really is a bonehead."

Torata Nanbu, leader of Tokyo Shock Boys and one of the people who had supported Tashiro's comeback, said: "My heart is aching very much. I don't mean to beat him up, but he makes me feel empty inside. I wonder if the drug might be more fascinating for him than the feeling of returning to the entertainment industry ... I cannot take any more. Regrettably, this is the end. It is no longer possible for him to restore his reputation." Tashiro had been scheduled to appear on Tashiro Nakamura Nanbu Akua-Chan, a Rainbowtown FM radio program, as part of his comeback but the program was cancelled.

He was released on parole on July 20, 2014, and began a stay at DARC Jeanne (Drug Addiction Rehabilitation Center Jeanne). Tashiro appeared at a press conference on March 18, 2015, announcing the opening of the Asagaya Loft A.

==== 2019 arrest ====
Tashiro was arrested again on November 6, 2019, on suspicion of drug use.

=== Car accident ===
Tashiro was rumored to be returning to the public eye in spring 2004 before he caused a car accident on Ōme Kaidō in Suginami. According to news reports, at about 1 am on June 16, 2004, he struck an 18-year-old vocational-school student who was riding a motorcycle after he made an illegal U-turn. The student was seriously injured.

== "Person of the Year" incident ==
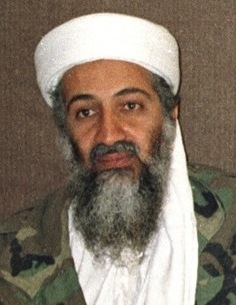
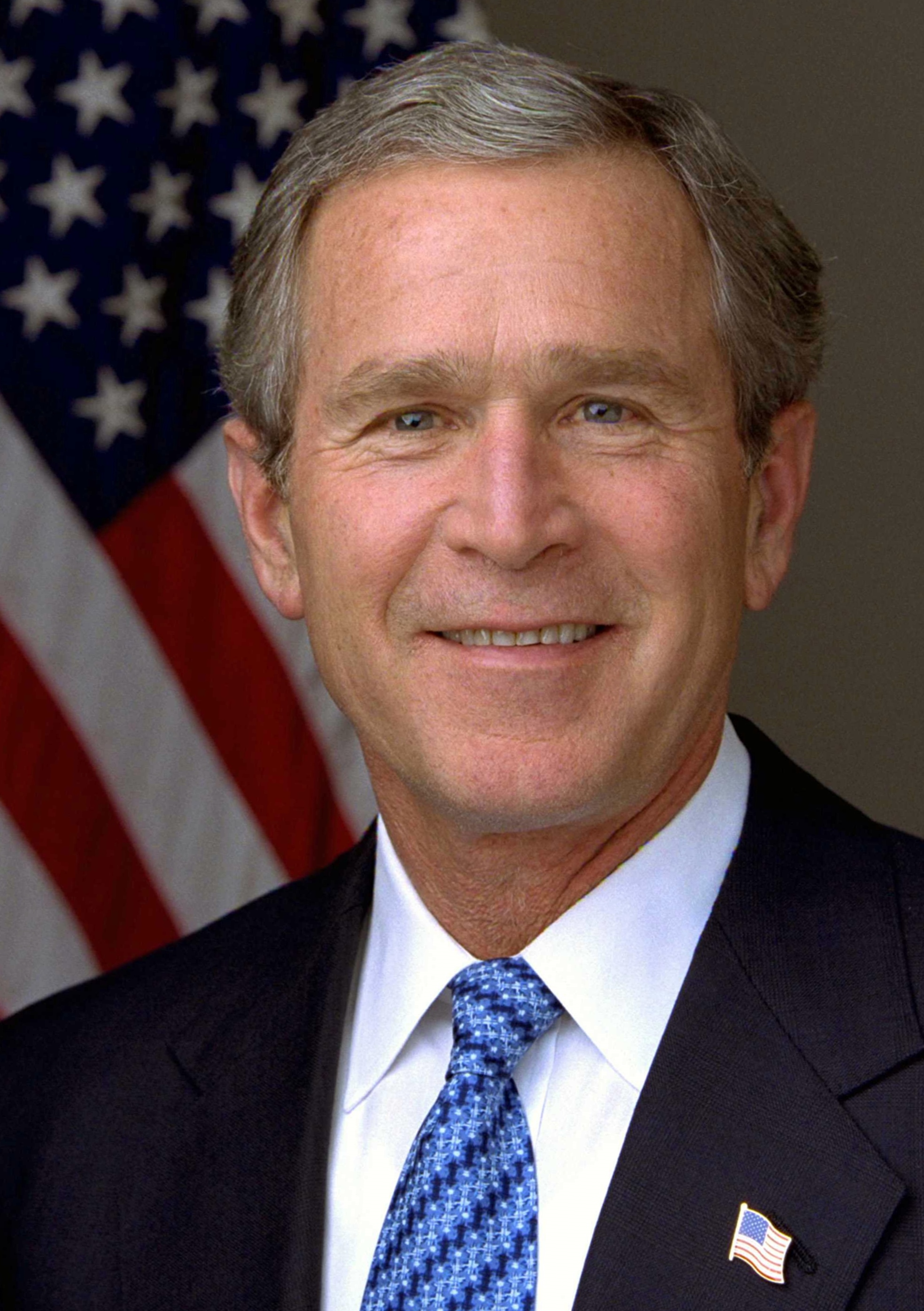
At one point, Tashiro led the online voting for 2001 Person of the Year, passing the number of votes received by Osama bin Laden (left) and George W. Bush.

In 2001, users of the internet forum 2channel (2ch) voted en masse for Tashiro as Time Magazine's Person of the Year. The voting was known as the "Tashiro Festival" (Tashiro Matsuri, 田代祭) by 2ch users. 2channel programmers developed scripts such as "Tashiro Cannon" (Tashiro-hō, 田代砲), "Mega particle Tashiro Cannon" (Mega-ryūshi Tashiro-hō, メガ粒子田代砲), "25 repeated blows Tashiro Cannon" (Nijū-go renda Tashiro-hō, 25連打田代砲), and "Super Tashiro Cannon" (Chō Tashiro-hō, 超田代砲) to vote repeatedly, and "Super Tashiro Cannon" crashed Time's website. Tashiro temporarily reached the number-one position, passing Osama bin Laden and George W. Bush, on December 21, 2001. Time's staff discovered the problem, however, and he was removed as a candidate.

== Appearances ==
=== Television ===
- Monomane Ōza Ketteisen (ものまね王座決定戦, The Mimic Champion Contest) (Fuji Television)
- Star Dokkiri Daisakusen (スターどっきり大作戦, Star candid great Strategy) (Fuji Television)
- Yūyake Nyan-Nyan (夕やけニャンニャン, Sunset Nyan Nyan) (Fuji Television)
- Shūkan Stamina Tengoku (週刊スタミナ天国, Weekly Stamina Heaven) (Fuji Television)
- Takeshi, Itsumi no Heisei Kyōiku Iinkai (たけし・逸見の平成教育委員会, Takeshi and Itsumi's Heisei Board of Education) (Fuji Television)
- Naruhodo! The World (なるほど!ザ・ワールド, Indeed! The World) (Fuji Television)
- Ken Shimura's idiotic feudal lord (志村けんのバカ殿様, Shimura Ken no baka tonosama) (Fuji Television)
- TV Crews Tonari no Papaya (TVクルーズ となりのパパイヤ, TV Crew next-door Papaya) (Fuji Television)
- Tokoro-san no Tadamono Dewa nai! (所さんのただものではない!, Mr. Tokoro's You are not ordinary!) (Fuji Television)
- Quiz Derby (クイズダービー) (TBS)
- Tokusō TV Gaburincho (特捜TVガブリンチョ, Special Investigation TV Chomp) (TV Asahi)
- Downtown DX (ダウンタウンDX) (NTV)
- Super J Channel ANN (スーパーJチャンネル ANN) (Friday, TV Asahi)
- Soreyuke! Marcy (それゆけ!マーシー, Let's go! Marcy, A program sponsored by a business enterprise) (MBS)
- Guruguru Ninety-Nine (ぐるぐるナインティナイン, guruguru naintinain)
- It's so cool! (めちゃ2イケてるッ!, mecha-mecha iketeruu!)

=== Radio ===
- Tashiro Masashi no Super Gang (田代まさしのスーパーギャング, Masashi Tashiro's Super Gang) (Thurdsday, TBS Radio) – October 1986 – March 1987
- Tashiro Masashi no Say! Young (田代まさしのセイ!ヤング, Masashi Tashiro's Say! Young) (QR)
- Tashiro Masashi no All Night Nippon (田代まさしのオールナイトニッポン, Masashi Tashiro's All Night Nippon) (LF)

=== Films ===
- Ultraman Gaia: The Battle in Hyperspace (1999)

== Music ==
See Rats & Star for work as a member of Chanels and Rats & Star.

- Nījima no Densetsu (新島の伝説, The legend of Nījima) (August 27, 1986)
- Paradis Latin no Yoru wa Fukete (パラディラタンの夜は更けて, Late in the night of Paradis Latin) (September 21, 1987, as "Shinnosuke & Marcy")
- Unjarage (ウンジャラゲ) (November 2, 1988, as Ken Shimura & Masashi Tashiro and Daijōbudā family)
- Nettaiya (熱帯夜, Sultry night) (July 1, 1994, as Marcy & Izumi)
- Bāsama to Jīsama no Serenade (婆様と爺様のセレナーデ, Serenade for an old man and woman) (December 17, 1993, as Ken & Marcy)
- Ai ga Natsukashii (愛が懐かしい, Nostalgia for love) (March 8, 1995, as Masashi Tashiro & Kuniko Asagi)
- Ultra Tengu (ウルトラ☆テング, The ultra long-nosed goblin) (August 14, 2010, as Marcy & Frontier Create)

== Books ==
- Tashiro Masashi no Dōtoku Yomihon (田代まさしの道徳読本, Masashi Tashiro's moral handbook) (May 1988, Kōdansha) – ISBN 4-06-103101-5
- Marcy no Chōhōsoku (マーシーの超法則, Marcy's super law) (April 1994, Magazine house) – ISBN 4-8387-0534-4
- Shinema de Aishite—Eiga no kazu hodo, Koishitai (シネマで愛して—映画の数ほど、恋したい, Love me in the cinema—I want to be in love almost as same as the number of films) (October 1993, Japan Literary Arts Company) – ISBN 4-537-02384-8
- Jibaku—The Judgement Day (自爆—THE JUDGEMENT DAY, Self-destruction or suicidal bombing) (July 2002 K2 publishing sale) – ISBN 4-434-02252-0

== See also ==
- Takeshi Kitano
- Nobuyoshi Kuwano
- Ken Shimura
- Sosuke Sumitani
- Masayuki Suzuki
- Voyeurism
- Kazuhide Uekusa
- Akiko Wada
