= Baye McNeil =

African-American writer living in Japan

Baye McNeil is an African-American writer and speaker who has lived in Japan since 2004. He is a columnist for The Japan Times and frequent contributor to the Japanese language online publication Toyo Keizai. He has authored two self-published memoirs, Hi! My Name is Loco and I am a Racist (2012) and Loco in Yokohama (2013).

== Early life ==
According to his books and interviews, McNeil was born in Brooklyn, New York, where he was raised by a single mother. He served in the U.S. Army and witnessed the events of 9/11. Baye McNeil moved to Japan in 2004. He worked as an English teacher at an eikaiwa for 3 years and then moved to Yokohama in 2008.

== Career ==
McNeil since then has blogged extensively from his website on topics mainly about racial issues. He has a monthly column called "Black Eye" in The Japan Times since 2014 about issues of race and ethnicity from his viewpoint as an African American. McNeil's commentary has been sought out by some journalists. He has appeared in various media outlets, including BBC, TBS, The New York Times, The Japan Times, The Washington Post and Japan Up Close commenting on issues about race in Japan.

In 2015, McNeil began a successful Change.org petition to remove a segment of the music show Music Fair planned to air on Fuji TV in Japan, in which Momoiro Clover Z and Rats & Star were to perform in blackface. Later, in 2018, comedian Masatoshi Hamada appeared in blackface on Japanese television. McNeil's opposition to this was covered internationally by news outlets such as BBC, The New York Times, the New York Daily News, Vox and TBS. However, some Japanese people argued that blackface was only considered offensive in America since they intentionally used it to mock black people back then while other countries don't have this historical context. This is despite the long history of blackface and dark iconography in many areas around the world that also hold a negative connotation.

== Disagreement on BLM in Japan ==
In 2020, Baye McNeil was upset about Japanese people for not supporting the BLM protests in Japan. Many locals view this movement as not related to themselves and also dangerous to the public for holding huge protests in the middle of a global pandemic. However, McNeil was angered by the fact that Japanese people are unable to feel empathy with Black Americans. He wrote a blog post expressing his disappointment and called the Japanese who opposed the protests "castrated".

== Books ==
- Hi! My Name is Loco and I am a Racist (Hunterfly Road Publishing, 2012) ISBN 978-0615587783
- Loco in Yokohama (Hunterfly Road Publishing, 2013) ISBN 978-0615885117
- Words By Baye, Art By Miki: Crafting a Life Together with Affection, Creativity, and Resilience (Hunterfly Road Publishing, 2024) ISBN 979-8218553715
