= Mieko Fukui =

Japanese basketball player

Personal information
- Nationality: Japanese
- Born: 3 December 1956; Hino, Japan
- Died: 30 November 1980 (aged 23)

Sport
- Sport: Basketball

Mieko Fukui (福井 美恵子, Fukui Mieko; 3 December 1956 – 30 November 1980) was a Japanese basketball player. She competed in the women's tournament at the 1976 Summer Olympics.
