= Fukushi Masaichi =

Japanese physician and pathologist

- 福士政一
- Born: January 30, 1878; Yamaguchi Prefecture, Japan
- Died: June 3, 1956 (aged 78)
- Citizenship: Japanese
- Education: Nippon Medical School
- Occupations: Physician, pathologist and professor
- Known for: Study of tattoos
- Children: 1

Fukushi Masaichi (福士 政一; 30 January 1878 – 3 June 1956) was a Japanese physician, pathologist and Emeritus Professor of Nippon Medical School in Tokyo. He was the founder of a collection of tattoos taken from the dead. Fukushi Masaichi and his son Fukushi Katsunari are known in Japan as "Irezumi Hakase" (刺青博士; approximately: "Dr. Tattoo").

== Life ==
Fukushi Masaichi studied at the Tokyo Imperial University Medicine. After studying in Germany, he began in 1914 at the Medical college Kanazawa University Kanazawa. He was chairman of the "Japanese Pathological Society" (日本病理学会, Nihon Byori Gakkai; lit. "The Japanese Society of Pathology"). The focus of his research was initially that syphilis caused aortitis and thyroid disease. He became interested in tattoos when he noticed that the tattoo ink in the skin killed the skin lesions of syphilis. Fukushi Masaichi himself was not tattooed. He was one of the organisers of the Tattoo League of Japan.

His research on the subject of human skin (from 1907) brought him into contact with many people that had tattoos. He therefore became interested in 1926 in the art of Japanese tattoo (Irezumi), led autopsies on corpses, removed the skin and did research on methods to preserve the skin. In the following years he collected an archive of about 2000 "hides" and 3000 photographs which were lost in 1945, during World War II.

Masaichi put some of his unique collection of tattooed hides and groomed skin that had been outsourced in the early 1940s in an air raid shelter. Since they were protected from the effects of war they survived the bombings. These skins are all that remains of his collection. At least 105 pieces remained intact. Masaichi set up a display in the Medical Pathology Museum of Tokyo University. The collection isn’t available to be viewed by the public.

== Bibliography ==
- Beeler, Karin (2005). Tattoos, Desire and Violence: Marks of Resistance in Literature, Film and Television. McFarland. ISBN 9780786482535. - Total pages: 240
- Hardy, Don Ed (1988). Life & Death Tattoos Volume 4, Issue 1 of Tattootime (Honolulu, Hawaii). Hardy Marks Publications. ISBN 9780945367055. - Total pages: 95
- LIFE (3 April 1950). "Speaking of Pictures..." Life Magazine. LIFE. pp. Volume 28, no. 14. ISSN 0024-3019.
- Quigley, Christine (1998). Modern Mummies: The Preservation of the Human Body in the Twentieth Century. McFarland. ISBN 9780786428519. - Total pages: 271
