= Masaharu Kondo =

Japanese bureaucrat (born 1956)

- 近藤 正春
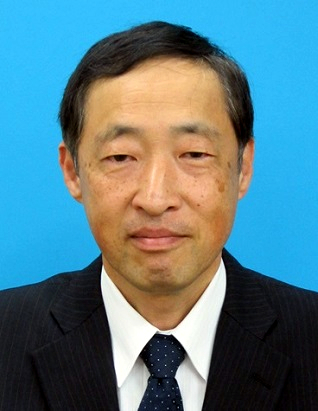
- Official portrait, 2019

Director General of the Cabinet Legislation Bureau
- In office 11 September 2019 – 27 August 2024
- Prime Minister: Shinzo Abe; Yoshihide Suga; Fumio Kishida
- Preceded by: Yūsuke Yokobatake
- Succeeded by: Nobuyuki Iwao

Personal details
- Born: 13 January 1956 (age 70) Aichi Prefecture, Japan
- Education: University of Tokyo

Masaharu Kondo (近藤 正春, Kondō Masaharu; born 13 January 1956) is a Japanese bureaucrat who served as Director-General of the Cabinet Legislation Bureau from 2019 to 2024. He was an official in the Ministry of International Trade and Industry before transferring to the bureau.

== Career ==
Masaharu Kondo was born in Aichi Prefecture on 13 January 1956. He studied law at the University of Tokyo and joined the Ministry of International Trade and Industry after graduating in 1978. Kondo held various positions within the ministry and its affiliated agencies, such as the Agency for Natural Resources and Energy, the Small and Medium Enterprise Agency, the Japan Patent Office and JETRO. He was also seconded to the Yamagata Prefectural Government and the Cabinet Legislation Bureau.

Kondo transferred to the Cabinet Legislation Bureau permanently in 2005. He successively served as director of the Second Department from 2010, of the First Department in 2011 and as Deputy Director General from 2014. Kondo was appointed Director General of the Cabinet Legislation Bureau in September 2019 under Prime Minister Shinzo Abe. He continued to serve under the cabinets of Yoshihide Suga and Fumio Kishida until retiring in August 2024.
