= Makiko Kinoshita =

Japanese composer (born 1956)

Makiko Kinoshita (木下 牧子, Kinoshita Makiko; born 1956) is a Japanese composer. She was born in Tokyo, and studied composition at Tokyo University of the Arts.

== Honors and awards ==
- First prize, Music Competition of Japan
- Outstanding Composition Award, Japan Symphony Foundation
- Mitsubishi Trust Art and Cultural Foundation award (2003)

== Works ==
Kinoshita is known in Japan for choral music, but writes for orchestra and chamber ensemble, and instruments, as well. Selected works include:

- Koten for orchestra
- Fantasy, for orchestra
- Aura, for Orchestra
- Alice's Adventures in Wonderland (Opera)
- Abyss of Night (for orchestra)
- Sinfonietta (for Strings)
- Gothic (for wind band)
- Rain (for mandolin orchestra)
- Percussion Concerto (for Percussion solo & percussion ensemble)
- The Trembling Moon (for Percussion ensemble)
- Twisting Landscapes (for Clarinet, Violin and Piano)
- A Circuit of Dreams (for Piano)
- Jashumon-Hikyoku (for mixed voices and orchestra)
- Blue (for female voices and percussion)
- Nirvana (vocal & piano)
- Circuit of Dream (piano suite)

Her music has been recorded and issued on CD, including:

- The Trembling Moon, (chamber music / ALM Records)
- Jashumon-Hikyoku (chorus and orchestra / Fontec)
- Blessing (chorus without accompaniment / Japan Traditional Cultures Foundation)
- Tsuyoshi Mihara Sings Makiko Kinoshita (lied album / Fontec)
