= Akie Asaka =

Japanese owarai tarento

- 浅香 あき恵
- Born: Akie Shuto; October 23, 1956 (age 70); Ōita, Ōita Prefecture, Japan
- Occupation: Comedian
- Years active: 1976 -
- Agent: Yoshimoto Kogyo
- Spouse: Takeshi Sato

Akie Sato (佐藤 秋恵, Satō Akie; née Shuto (首藤, Shutō), born October 23, 1956, in Ōita, Ōita Prefecture, Japan), better known as Akie Asaka (浅香 あき恵, Asaka Akie), is a Japanese comedian who is represented by the talent agency, Yoshimoto Kogyo.

Asaka was a resident in Kita-ku, Sakai, Osaka Prefecture. She is also an actress for Yoshimoto Shinkigeki.

== Filmography ==
=== TV Series ===
Title	Network	Notes
Gurutto Kansai Plus	NHK	
Hakkō Noji Moto Motto!	TV Osaka	
Ohayō Asahi desu	ABC	
Chi-chin Puipui Kin Yōbi Kin Yō Jiken-bo	MBS	
Yoshimoto Shinkigeki	MBS	
Narumi Okamura no Sugiru TV	ABC	

=== Advertisements ===
Title	Notes
Nara Kenkō Land	Co-starring with Aki Hoshino
