= Toritsu-daigaku Station =

Railway station in Tokyo, Japan

Coordinates: 35.617833°N 139.676389°E

Toritsu-daigaku Station 都立大学駅

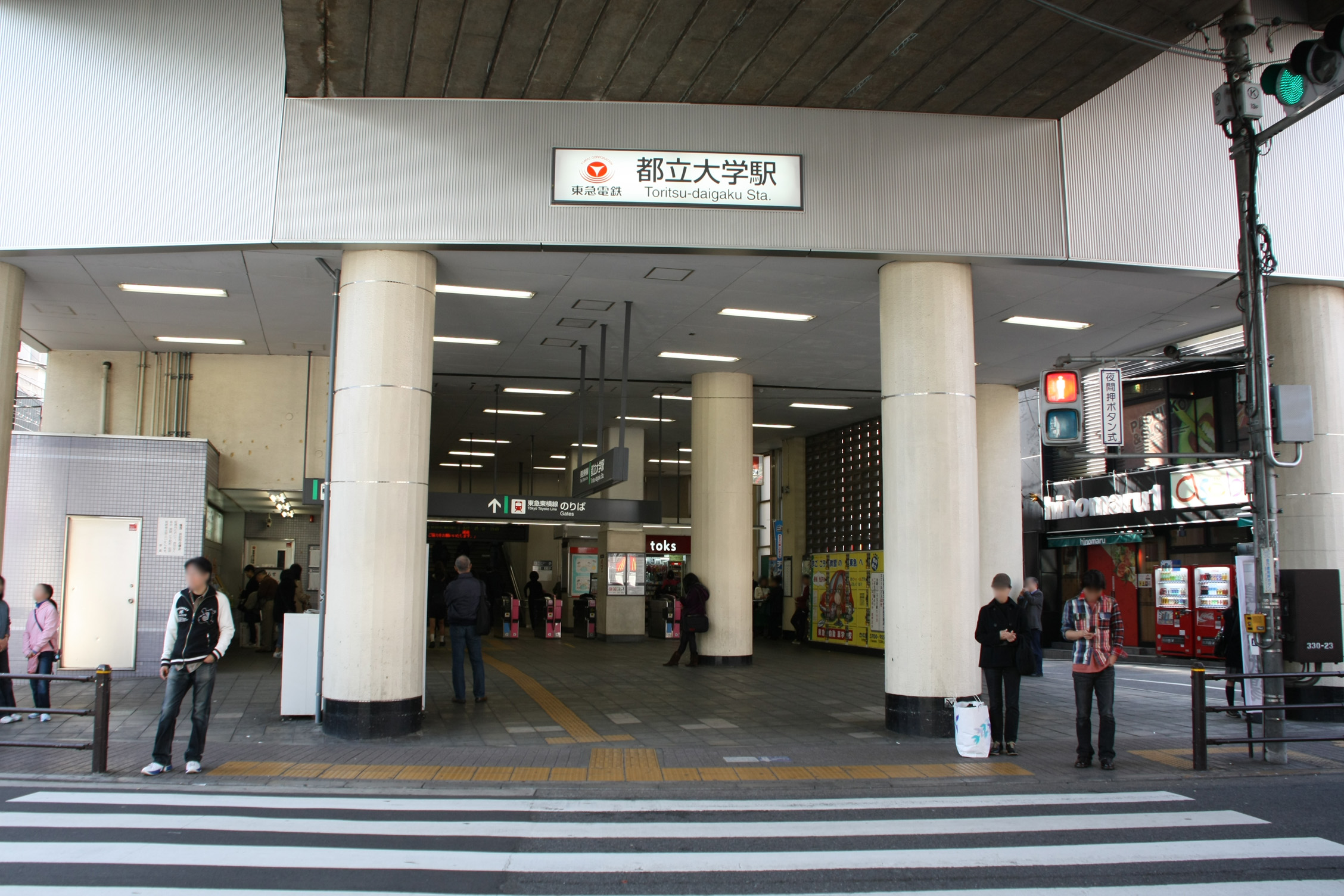
- Entrance in February 2009

General information
- Location: 3-2 Takaban, Meguro Ward, Tōkyō 152-0004; Japan
- Operator: Tōkyū Railways
- Line: Tōyoko Line
- Distance: 5.6 km (3.5 mi) from Shibuya
- Platforms: 2 side platforms
- Tracks: 2

Construction
- Structure type: Elevated

Other information
- Station code: TY06
- Website: Official website

History
- Opened: 28 August 1927; 98 years ago

Passengers
- 40,570 daily (2021)

Services
Preceding station	Tōkyū Railways	Following station
Jiyūgaoka towards Yokohama	Tōyoko Line Local	Gakugei-daigaku towards Shibuya
Location
- Location within Special wards of Tokyo Location within Tokyo Bay and Bōsō Peninsula Location within Tokyo Location within Japan

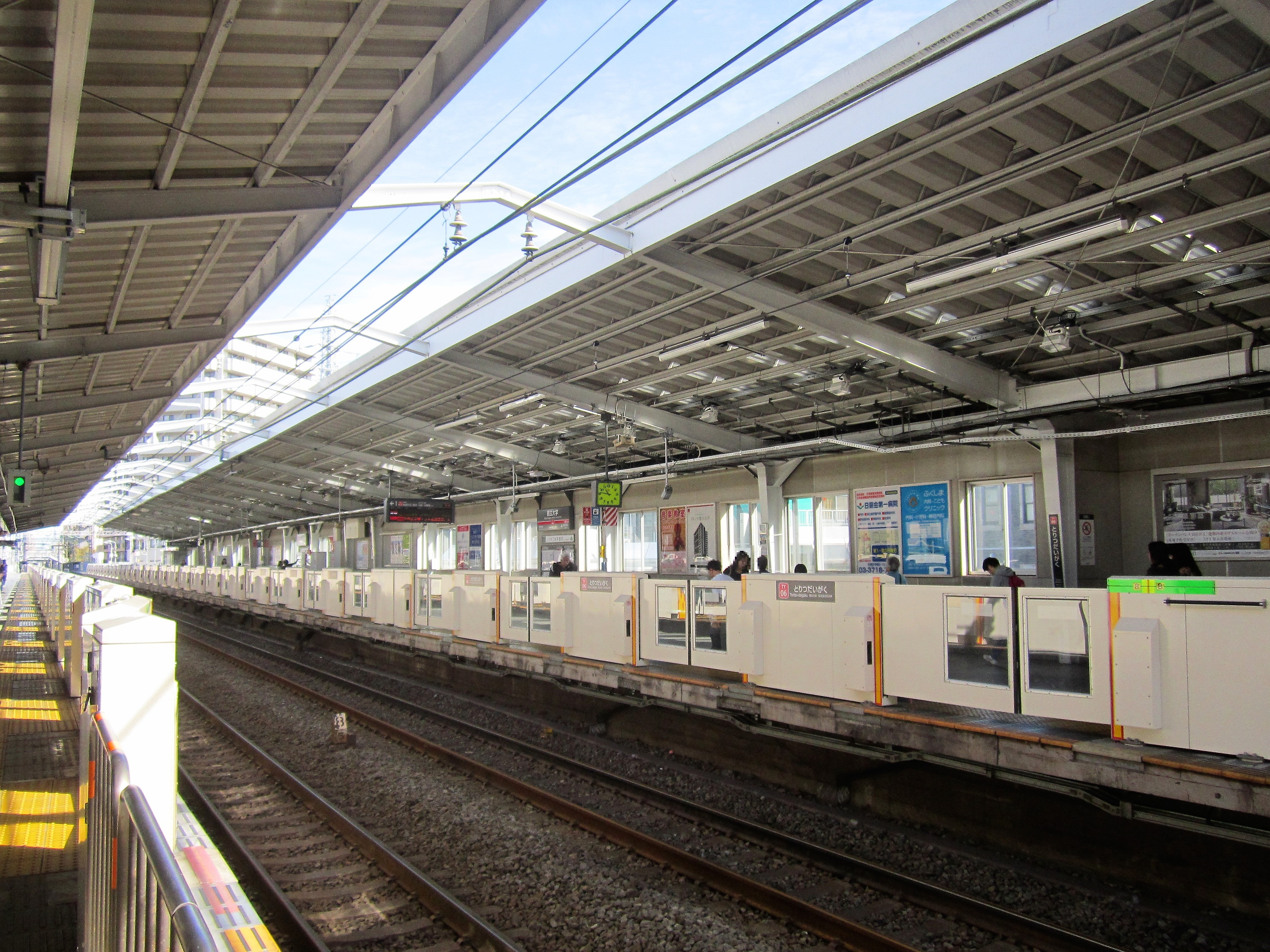
Platform

Toritsu-daigaku Station (都立大学駅, Toritsudaigaku-eki) is a Tōkyū Tōyoko Line station located in Meguro Ward, Tōkyō.

== Station layout ==
This elevated station consists of two opposite side platforms serving two tracks. This local station can only accommodate trains up to eight cars long.

1	■ Tokyu Toyoko Line	for Jiyūgaoka, Musashi-kosugi, Kikuna, and Yokohama; Minatomirai Line for Motomachi-Chūkagai
2	■ Tokyu Toyoko Line	for Naka-meguro and Shibuya; Tokyo Metro Fukutoshin Line for Kotake-Mukaihara and Wakōshi

== History ==
Toritsu-daigaku Station opened on 28 August 1927 as Kakinokizaka Station. It gained its current name in 1952.
