= Nobuyoshi Kuwano =

Japanese television performer

Nobuyoshi Kuwano (桑野 信義, Kuwano Nobuyoshi, born April 4, 1957 in Ōta, Tokyo) is a Japanese television performer, former member of Rats & Star. His nickname is "Kuwa-man" (桑マン). In Rats & Star, he took charge of the trumpet and vocals. After the group broke up, he shifted to a television comedian and co-starred with The Drifters' Ken Shimura and Masashi Tashiro. He took over as lead vocalist of Rats & Star during Masayuki Suzuki's solo concert tour.

He appears in some Japanese television programs as a performer. He was disappointed by Masashi Tashiro's arrest. He also said to Tashiro in public, "It's disappointing. Please atone for your crimes and thoroughly cleanse your body and soul" following Tashiro's retirement from the entertainment world.

== See also ==
Members of Rats & Star era

- Masayuki Suzuki
- Masashi Tashiro
