= Hisashi Okamoto =

Japanese mathematician

Hisashi Okamoto (岡本 久, Okamoto Hisashi, born 23 November 1956) is a Japanese applied mathematician, specializing in mathematical fluid mechanics and computational fluid dynamics.

Okamoto graduated from the University of Tokyo in March 1979. In April 1981 he became a research associate to Hiroshi Fujita (known for the Fujita-Kato theorem) at the University of Tokyo. There in 1985 he received his Doctorate of Science with Fujita as advisor. For the academic year 1986–1987 Okamoto was a visiting fellow at the University of Minnesota's Institute for Mathematics and Its Applications. In August 1987 Okamoto became an associate professor in the University of Tokyo's Department of Applied Science. In 1988 he visited the National University of Singapore. At Kyoto University's Research Institute for Mathematical Sciences (RIMS), he became an associate professor in April 1990 and a full professor in April 1994. At RIMS he was Head of the Computer Science Research Laboratory from 2004 to 2005 and deputy director in 2006, 2009, and 2011. He is editor-in-chief of the Japan Journal of Industrial and Applied Mathematics (JJIAM).

Okamoto is the author or co-author of over 100 articles in refereed journals or in books of conference proceedings. He wrote, with Mayumi Shōji, the 2001 monograph The mathematical theory of permanent progressive water-waves.

== Awards and honors ==
- 1998 — Invited Speaker, International Congress of Mathematicians, Berlin 1998
- 2002 — Inoue Science Award
- 2011 — President of the East Asia SIAM, 2011–2012
- 2013 — Fellow of the Japan Society of Fluid Mechanics
- 2013 — Fellow of the Japan Society for Industrial and Applied Mathematics
- 2015 — Plenary Lecturer, Mathematical Society of Japan, September 2015.
- 2016 — Hiroshi Fujiwara Prize on Mathematical Science
