= Akio Miyazawa =

Japanese playwright and writer (1956–2022)

- 宮沢 章夫
- Born: 9 December 1956; Kakegawa, Japan
- Died: 12 September 2022 (aged 65); Tokyo, Japan
- Education: Tama Art University
- Occupations: Playwright; Writer

Akio Miyazawa (Japanese: 宮沢 章夫 Miyazawa Akio; 9 December 1956 – 12 September 2022) was a Japanese playwright, writer, and academic.

== Biography ==
Miyazawa studied at Tama Art University, which he left prematurely to co-found the group Radical Gajiberibinba System alongside Makoto Ōtake, Kitarō, Shigeru Saiki, Naoto Takenaka, and Yūji Nakamura.

In 1990, Miyazawa founded the theatre company U-enchi Saisei Jigyōdan. His book, Search Engine System Crash, earned him the Akutagawa Prize and the Mishima Yukio Prize. In 1993, he received the Kishida Prize for Drama for his play, Hinemi. In 2005, he was a visiting professor at Waseda University.

Miyazawa died of heart failure in Tokyo on 12 September 2022, at the age of 65.

== Plays ==
- Hinemi (1992)
- Nyūtaun iriguchi (2007)
