= Rats & Star =

Japanese musical group

- Also known as: Chanels
- Genres: Doo-wop
- Years active: 1975–1996
- Members: Masayuki Suzuki; Masashi Tashiro; Nobuyoshi Kuwano; Yoshio Sato; Hiroyuki Kuboki; Ryoichi Izumo; Kiyotaka Shinpo

Rats & Star (ラッツ&スター, Rattsu ando Sutā), formerly called Shanels or Chanels, was a Japanese male pop group that specialized in doo-wop-influenced music. The group was led by Masayuki Suzuki.

Their debut single Runaway reached number 1 on the Oricon Singles Chart in 1980. Their single Megumi no Hito reached number 1 on the Oricon Singles Chart in 1983. Their album Mr Black reached number 1 on the Cash Box chart in 1980. Their album Live at Whiskey A Go Go reached number 1 on the Oricon chart, and the Music Labo chart, in 1981.

== History ==
In 1975, Masayuki Suzuki, Masashi Tashiro and Nobuyoshi Kuwano, joined to form a band called Chanels. The band debuted in 1980 with their first single "Runaway" selling over a million copies and becoming a huge hit. In 1983, the band changed its name to Rats & Star due to complaints from the French fashion giant Chanel. Andy Warhol created the album cover for Soul Vacation and the name change seemed to make no difference in sales, as their first single as Rats & Star, "Me-Gumi no Hito", sold over 800,000 copies. Five of the members were married at Tokyo's Hie Shrine at the same time during 1985, generating a lot of publicity for the group. Rats & Star released a duet with Masayuki's older sister Kiyomi Suzuki called "Lonely Chaplain" in 1986, which also became a huge hit. However, leader Masayuki Suzuki launched a solo career and Rats & Star's activity thus essentially stopped. Afterward, Tashiro and Kuwano remained popular not as musical artists, but as TV performers. They formed Rats & Star again in the limitation of half a year and released the single "Yume de Aetara" in 1996, which was popular enough to encourage the group to go on a final nationwide tour. The same year, they made their first appearance on Kōhaku Uta Gassen to perform that song.

The group's name is a palindrome, reading the same both backwards and forwards. The name's true meaning, however, is that "rats" raised in the less affluent parts of town could, by singing doo-wop music, reverse their fortunes and collectively become a "star".

In 2006, Suzuki, Kuwano and Sato formed "Gosperats" with Japanese a cappella singing group Gospellers' member Tetsuya Murakami and Yuji Sakai.

In February 2015, a joint performance recorded by Momoiro Clover Z and Rats & Star for the Fuji TV show Music Fair was removed from broadcast due to controversy over the appearance by both groups in blackface in the performance, a photo of which Rats & Star had tweeted before the broadcast date after recording. A Change.org petition had been started after the tweet by Japan Times contributor Baye McNeil, who is African American, amid conversations over racism in Japan.

Unique Andy Warhol screen prints of the album cover Soul Vacation have sold for upwards of $25,000 each.

== Members ==
- Masayuki Suzuki – Lead vocal, Martin
- Masashi Tashiro – Tenor vocal, Marcy
- Nobuyoshi Kuwano – Trumpet, Vocal, Kuwa-man
- Yoshio Sato – Bass vocal
- Hiroyuki Kuboki – Tenor vocal
- Ryoichi Izumo – Guitar, Vocal
- Kiyotaka Shinpo – Drums, Vocal

== Discography ==
=== Chanels ===
- Runaway (1980)
- Tonight (1980)
- Machikado Twilight (1981)
- Hurricane (1981) (famously covered by Puffy AmiYumi)
- Namida no Sweet Cherry (1981)
- Hey Brother (1982) Epic/Sony
- Akogare no Slender Girl (1982)
- Summer Holiday (1982)
- Moshikashite I LOVE YOU (1982)
- Shuumatsu Dynamite (1982)

=== Rats & Star ===
- Me-Gumi no Hito (1983)
- T-shatsu ni Kuchibeni (1983)
- Konya wa Physical (1983)
- Gekka Bijin (Moonlight Honey) (1984)
- Glamour Guy (1984)
- Kuchibiru ni Knife (1984)
- Madonna wa Omae Dake (1985)
- Lady Eccentric (1985)
- Lonely Chaplain (1986) (duet with Kiyomi Suzuki)
- Yume de Aetara (reunion, 1996)
