= Hiroshi Hasebe =

Japanese theatre critic

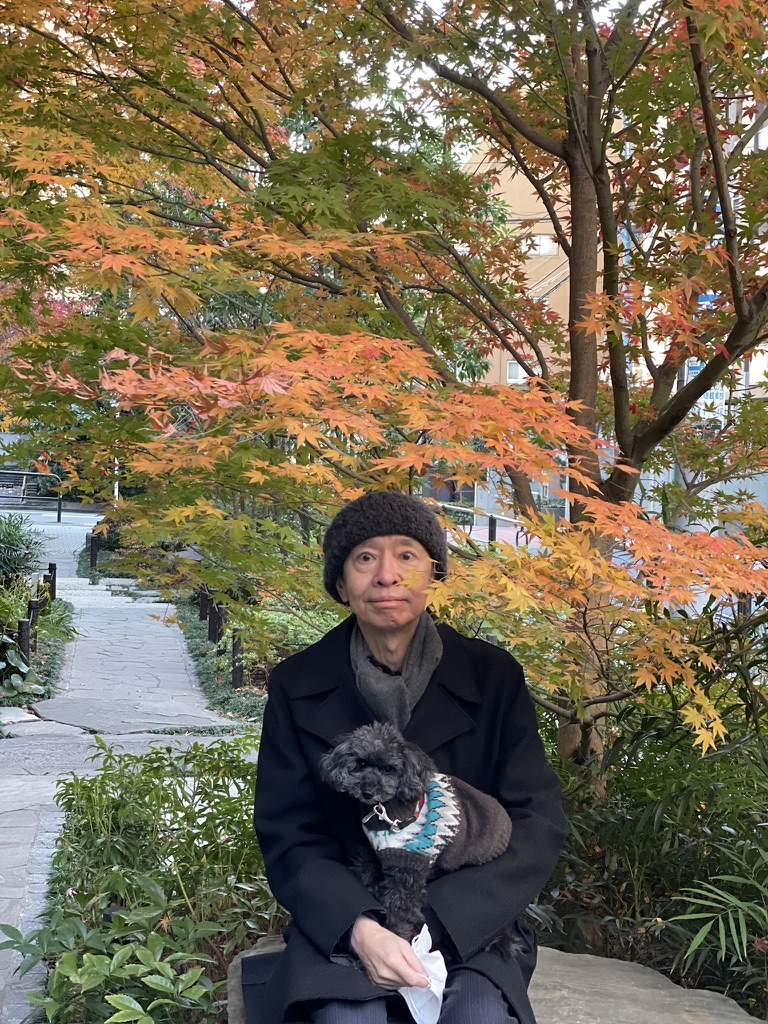

Hiroshi Hasebe (長谷部 浩, Hasebe Hiroshi) is the professional pseudonym of Makoto Matsuno (松野 誠, Matsuno Makoto; born 17 December 1956), a Japanese theatre critic and professor at Tokyo University of the Arts (Fine Arts, Department of Inter Media Art).

== Career ==
Hiroshi Hasebe is the professional pseudonym of Makoto Matsuno. Born in Saitama Prefecture, Japan, he graduated from the Faculty of Law at Keio University. After fifteen years working at a publishing company he began his career as a theatre critic. He joined the teaching faculty in the Department of Intermedia Art in the Faculty of Fine Arts at the Tokyo University of the Arts in 1999, serving initially as associate professor until his appointment as full professor in 2010.

He engages in a wide range of theatre criticism extending from Kabuki to contemporary theatre. He has served as drama critic on newspapers including the Nikkei and the Tokyo Shimbun, especially in connection with the Kabuki theatre. He also writes criticism on his official website entitled ‘Hiroshi Hasebe TheatreGoer Directory’.

He served as adviser on the 2005 production of Ninagawa Twelfth Night) directed by Yukio Ninagawa and presented at the Barbican Theatre in London. He has served on the board of adjudicators for several prestigious awards including the Yomiuri Theatre Prize (Yomiuri Engeki Taishō). He is currently on the board of adjudicators for the Kinokuniya Theatre Awards (Kinokuniya Engeki Shō), and is writing the serial article, “Scene Changes” for the magazine Higeki- Kigeki (Hayakawa Publishing).

Hasebe's work falls into two main categories, one being criticism of individual theatrical productions. A major characteristic of his criticism since the start of his career has been a deep interest in iconography. Japanese theatrical criticism had tended before then to be concerned exclusively with actors and acting. Hasebe changed the focus of criticism to incorporate critical interpretation and analysis of visual elements such as set designs, costumes, propose and lighting.

The second focus of his work has been biographies of directors and Kabuki actors. His work in this area has been based on a wide variety of sources including formal interviews, private conversations and email communications in addition to bibliographical sources. His methodology brings figures engaged in the world of the theatre vividly to life in his work.

== Bibliography ==
Books by Hiroshi Hasebe:

- Kotoba no Gekijo (The Theatre of Words), Tokyo: Ronsosha, 2025 ISBN 978-4-8460-2507-6
- Bando Mitsugorō, Kabuki no tanoshimi (Bando Mitsugorō, Enjoying Kabuki), Tokyo: Iwanami Gendai Bunko, 2015 ISBN 978-4006022655
- Bando Mitsugorō, Odori no tanoshimi (Bando Mitsugorō, Enjoying Dance), Tokyo: Iwanami Gendai Bunko, 2015 ISBN 978-4000244633
- Noda Hideki no engeki (The Theatre of Noda Hideki), Tokyo: Kawaide Shobō Shinsha, 2014 ISBN 978-4309275499
- Tensai to meijin, Nakamura Kanzaburō to Bandō Mitsugorō (Genius and Master, Nakamura Kanzaburō and Bandō Mitsugorō), Tokyo: Bunshun Shinsho, 2016 ISBN 978-4166610662
- Kikunosuke no reigi (The Propriety of Kikunosuke), Tokyo: Shinchōsha, 2014 ISBN 978-4103367512
- Kenryoku to kodoku, Enshutsuka Ninagawa Yukio no jidai (Power and Solitude, The Age of the Director Ninagawa Yukio), Iwanami Shoten, 2017 ISBN 978-4000611985
- Enshutsujutsu (The Art of Theatrical Direction), Tokyo: Chikuma Shobō, 2012 ISBN 978-4480429469
- Kikugorō no iroke (The Allure of Kikugorō), Tokyo: Bunshun Shinsho, 2007 ISBN 978-4166605743
- Noda Hideki ron (Noda Hideki), Tokyo: Kawaide Shobō Shinsha, 2005 ISBN 978-4309268194
- Kizutsuita sei, David Leveaux enshutsu no gihō (Wounded Sexuality: The Theatrical Technique of David Leveaux), Tokyo: Kinokuniya Shoten, 1997 ISBN 978-4314008082
- Nusumareta riaru: 90 nendai engeki wa kataru (Stolen reality: Theatre of the 1990s), Tokyo: Asuki, 1998 ISBN 978-4757202009
- 4 byō no kakumei, Tōkyō no engeki 1982-1992 (The 4-Second Revolution: The Theatre of Tokyo, 1982–92), Tokyo: Kawaide Shobō Shinsha, 1993 ISBN 978-4309261867

== Criticism of the work of Hiroshi Hasebe ==
- Ogawa Setsuko, 'Power and Solitude', Mainichi Shimbun, June 17, 2017
- Watanabe Tamotsu, 'Genius and Master', Mainichi Shimbun, June 22, 2016
- Yano Seiichi, 'The Secret of Beauty on the Stage', Shinchōsha, December 1, 2014
