= Masayuki Suzuki =

Japanese singer (born 1956)

Masayuki Suzuki 鈴木雅之
- Also known as: Martin
- Born: September 22, 1956 (age 70); Ōta, Tokyo, Japan
- Genres: J-pop, R&B, funk
- Occupation: Singer
- Years active: 1975–present
- Label: Epic Records Japan
- Formerly of: Rats & Star
- Website: martin.jp

Masayuki Suzuki (鈴木雅之, Suzuki Masayuki, born September 22, 1956, in Ōta, Tokyo) is a Japanese singer best known as a former member of pop group Rats & Star (previously called Chanels), and for performing the opening themes for the anime television series Kaguya-sama: Love Is War. He is also called Japan's King Of Love Songs. His trademarks are sunglasses and a moustache, and he is nicknamed "Martin".

== Profile ==
Suzuki was born in Tokyo on September 22, 1956. His sister Kiyomi Suzuki is also a musician. He rose to fame as a member of the pop group Rats & Star (formerly known as Chanels), which began activities in 1975. His first single "Runaway" was released in 1980. He would continue solo music activities after Rats & Star disbanded in 1996.

Since 2019, Suzuki has performed the opening themes for the anime television series Kaguya-sama: Love Is War. In 2019, he sang "Love Dramatic feat. Rikka Ihara", the opening theme for the series's first season. In 2020, he sang "Daddy! Daddy! Do! feat. Airi Suzuki" (no relation), the opening theme for the show's second season. In 2022, he sang "Giri Giri" with Suu from Silent Siren, the opening theme for the show's third season. He also sang "Love is Show feat. Reni Takagi", the opening theme for the animated film, Kaguya-sama: Love is War - The First Kiss That Never Ends. In 2025, he sang "Abunai Kioku" (アブナイキオク; lit. 'Dangerous Memory'), the opening theme for the television special, Kaguya-sama: Love Is War – The Stairway to Adulthood.

== Discography ==
=== Studio albums ===
- Mother of Pearl (1986)
- Radio Days (1988)
- Dear Tears (1989)
- Mood (1990)
- Fair Affair (1992)
- Perfume (1993)
- She See Sea (1994)
- Carnival (1997)
- Tokyo Junction (2001)
- Shh... (2004)
- Ebony & Ivory (2005)
- Still Gold (2009)
- dolce (2016)
- Funky Flag (2019)
- All Time Rock 'n' Roll (2020)
- Soul Navigation (2023)
- Snazzy (2024)
- All Time Doo Wop ! ! (2025)

=== Compilations ===
- Martini (1991)
- Martini II (1995)
- Medium Slow (2000)
- Martini Blend (2003)
- Martini Duet (2007)
- Martini Duet Deluxe (2026)
- Masterpieces (2026)

=== Cover albums ===
- Soul Legend (2001)
- Discover Japan (2011)
- Discover Japan II (2014)
- Discover Japan III (2017)
- Discover Japan DX (2022)

== See also ==
- Masashi Tashiro
- Nobuyoshi Kuwano
