= Kita-Ikebukuro Station =

Railway station in Tokyo, Japan

Coordinates: 35.7415°N 139.7168°E

TJ02 Kita-Ikebukuro Station 北池袋駅
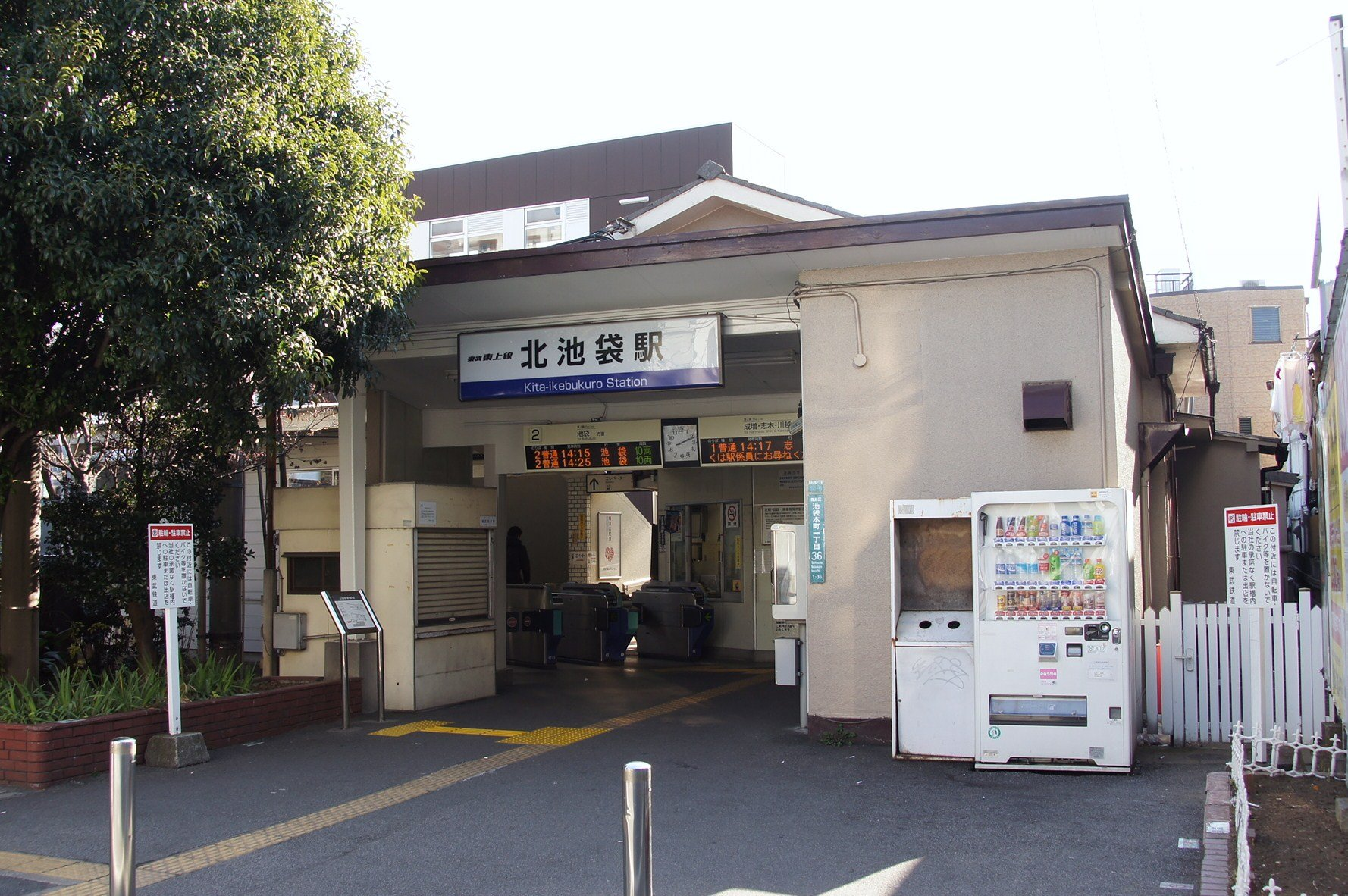
- The station entrance in February 2012

General information
- Location: 1-36-6 Ikebukuro-honchō, Toshima-ku, Tokyo 171-0011; Japan
- Operator: Tobu Railway
- Line: Tobu Tojo Line
- Distance: 1.2 km from Ikebukuro
- Platforms: 1 island platform
- Tracks: 2

Other information
- Station code: TJ-02
- Website: www.tobu.co.jp/station/info/7201.html

History
- Opened: 1 May 1934; 92 years ago
- Former names: Tōbu Horinouchi (until 1947)

Passengers
- FY2014: 8,921 daily

Services
Preceding station	Tobu Railway	Following station
Shimo-Itabashi TJ03 towards Yorii	Tojo Line Local	Ikebukuro TJ01 Terminus
Location
- Location within Japan

Kita-Ikebukuro Station (北池袋駅, Kita-Ikebukuro-eki) is a railway station on the Tobu Tojo Line in Toshima, Tokyo, Japan, operated by the private railway operator Tobu Railway.

== Lines ==
Kita-Ikebukuro Station is served by the Tobu Tojo Line from Ikebukuro in Tokyo. Located between Ikebukuro and Shimo-Itabashi, it is 1.2 km from the Ikebukuro terminus. Only "Local" (all-stations) trains stop at this station, with eight services per hour in each direction during the daytime.

== Station layout ==
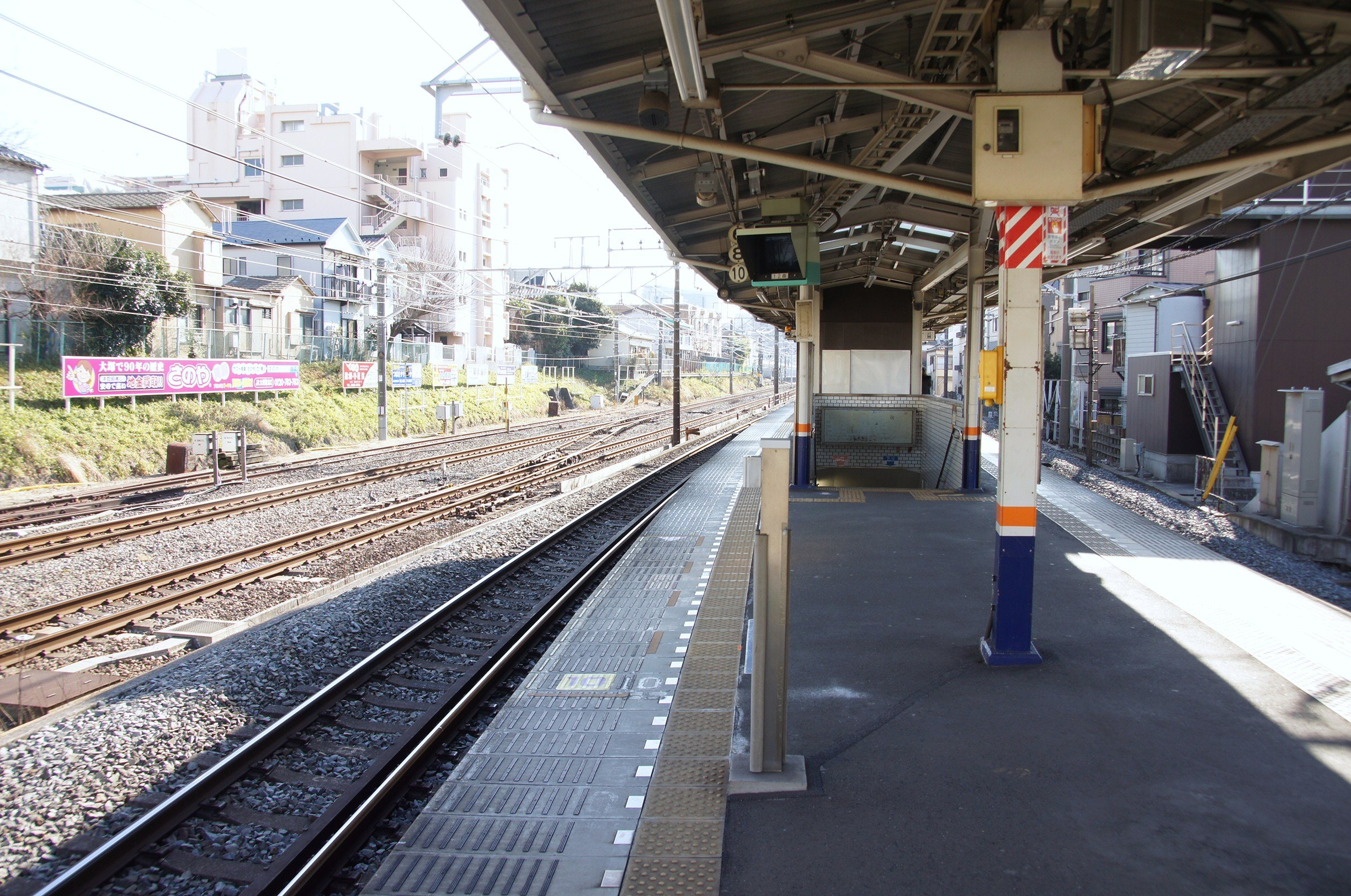
View from the north end of the platforms, with the JR Saikyo Line tracks on the left, February 2012

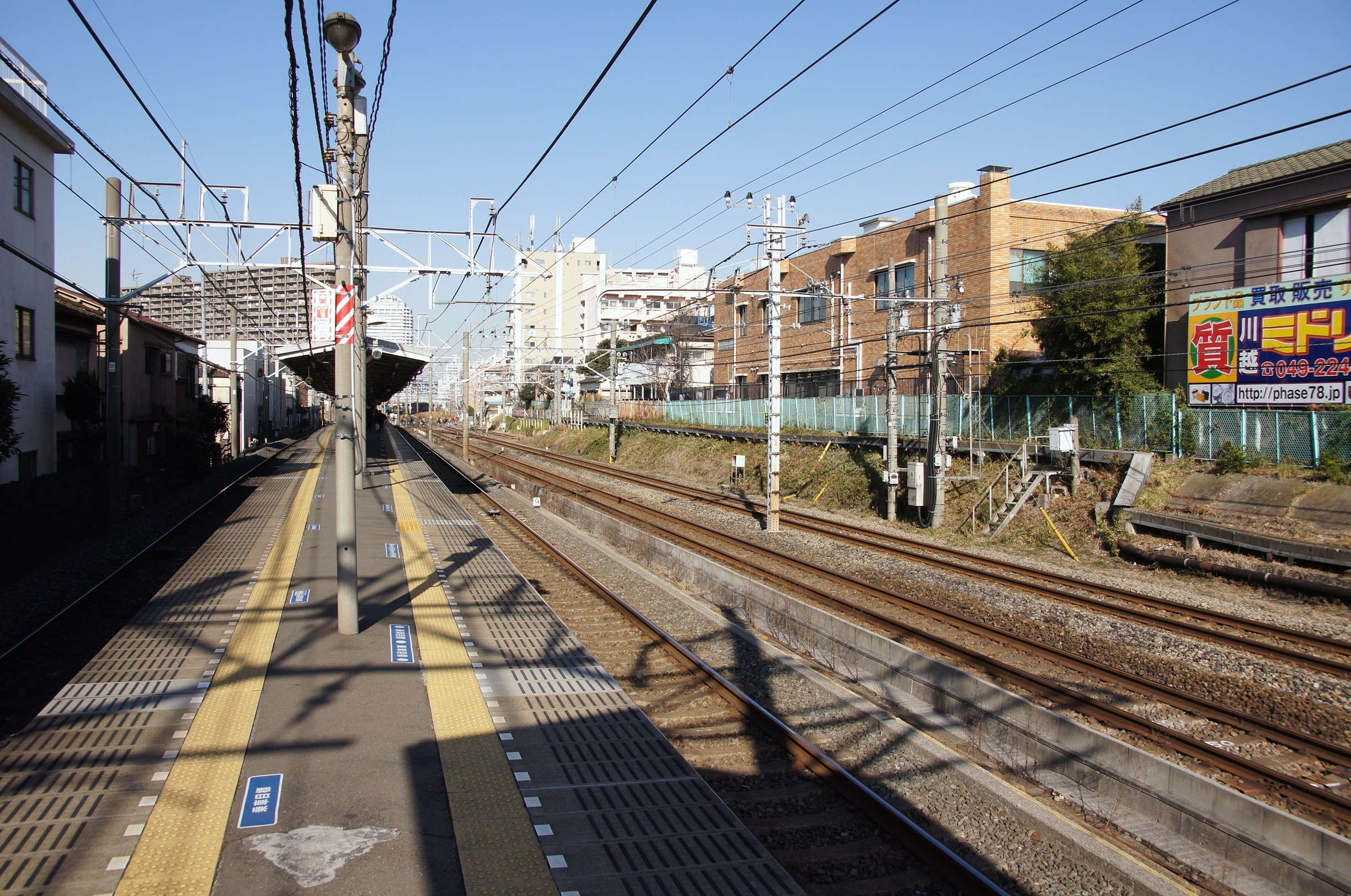
View from the south end of the platforms, with the JR Saikyo Line tracks on the right, February 2012

The station consists of a single island platform serving two tracks. The platforms are connected to the station entrance located on the west side of the tracks by an underground passage.

=== Platforms ===
1	Tobu Tojo Line	for Kami-Itabashi, Narimasu, and Shiki
2	Tobu Tojo Line	for Ikebukuro

== History ==
The station first opened on 1 May 1934 as Tōbu Horinouchi Station (東武堀之内駅). This station was destroyed by fire on 14 April 1945 during Bombing of Tokyo in World War II, forcing its use to be suspended from 20 May, and then formally closed on 19 August 1947. The station reopened as Kita-Ikebukuro Station on 1 September 1951.

From 17 March 2012, station numbering was introduced on the Tobu Tojo Line, with Kita-Ikebukuro Station becoming "TJ-02".

== Passenger statistics ==
In fiscal 2014, the station was used by an average of 8,921 passengers daily. The passenger figures for previous years are as shown below.

Fiscal year	Daily average
2010	8,507
2011	8,402
2012	8,520
2013	8,826
2014	8,921

== Accidents ==
On 22 July 2003 at 00:01, an unidentified passenger sitting between the rails was killed by a passing train.

On 21 July 2006 at around 09:30, a woman in her forties was hit and killed by a down train after attempting to cross the Tojo Line No. 2 level crossing immediately to the south of the station after the barriers had closed. Her 9-year-old daughter survived with serious injuries.

== Surrounding area ==
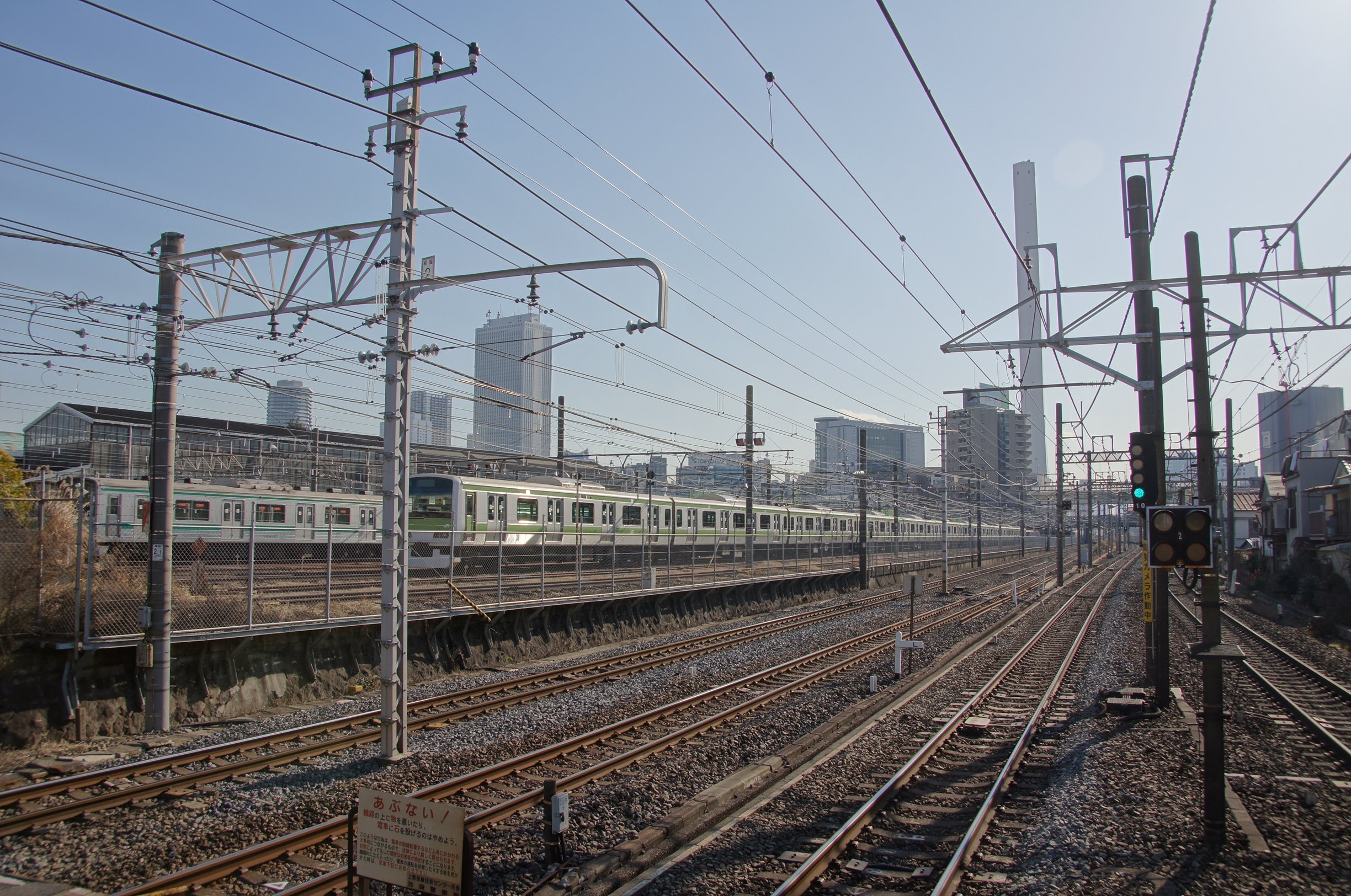
JR East Ikebukuro stabling depot viewed from the south end of the station platforms, February 2012

- JR East Ikebukuro Depot
- Tokyo College of Transport Studies
- Showa Tetsudo High School
- Toshima Gakuin High school
- Toshima Ward Ikebukuro Library

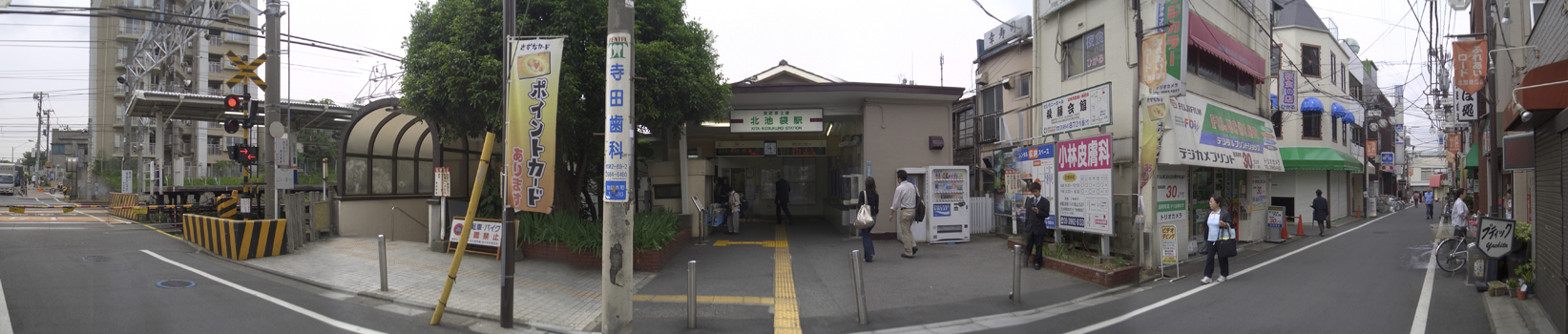
Panoramic view of the station entrance and adjacent level crossing in May 2008

== See also ==
- List of railway stations in Japan
