= Tokiwadai Station =

Tokiwadai Station (ときわ台駅, Tokiwadai-eki) is the name of two train stations in Japan:

- Tokiwadai Station (Osaka)
- Tokiwadai Station (Tokyo)
