= Naka-Itabashi Station =

Railway station in Tokyo, Japan

TJ05 Naka-Itabashi Station 中板橋駅
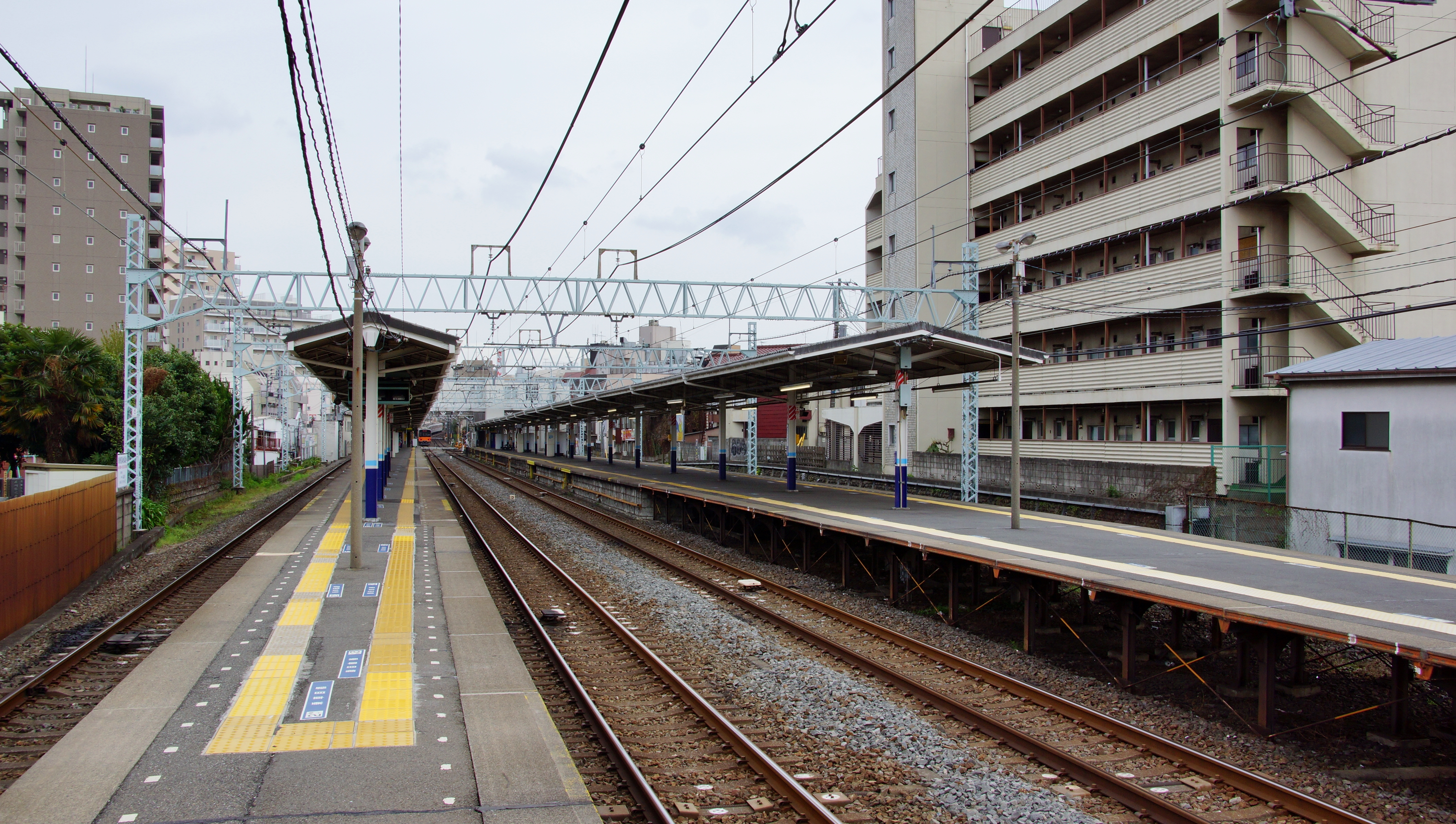
- The down end of the platforms in April 2016

General information
- Location: 33–1 Yayoi-chō, Itabashi-ku, Tokyo 173–0021; Japan
- Coordinates: 35°45′23″N 139°41′39″E
- Operator: Tobu Railway
- Line: Tobu Tojo Line
- Distance: 43.0 km from Ikebukuro
- Platforms: 2 island platforms
- Tracks: 4

Construction
- Structure type: At-grade
- Accessible: Yes

Other information
- Station code: TJ-05
- Website: Official website

History
- Opened: 12 July 1933; 93 years ago

Passengers
- FY2014: 26,961 daily

Services
Preceding station	Tobu Railway	Following station
Tokiwadai TJ06 towards Yorii	Tojo Line Local	Ōyama TJ04 towards Ikebukuro
Location
- Location within Japan

Naka-Itabashi Station (中板橋駅, Naka-Itabashi-eki) is a railway station on the Tobu Tojo Line in Itabashi, Tokyo, Japan, operated by the private railway operator Tobu Railway.

== Lines ==
Naka-Itabashi Station is served by the Tobu Tojo Line from Ikebukuro in Tokyo. Located between Ōyama and Tokiwadai, it is 4.0 km from the Ikebukuro terminus. Only "Local" (all-stations) services stop at this station, with eight trains per hour in each direction during the daytime.

== Station layout ==
The station consists of two island platforms serving four tracks. Platforms 2 and 3 are used to allow non-stop trains to pass stopping trains.

=== Platforms ===
1/2	Tobu Tojo Line	for Kami-Itabashi, Narimasu, and Shiki
3/4	Tobu Tojo Line	for Ōyama and Ikebukuro

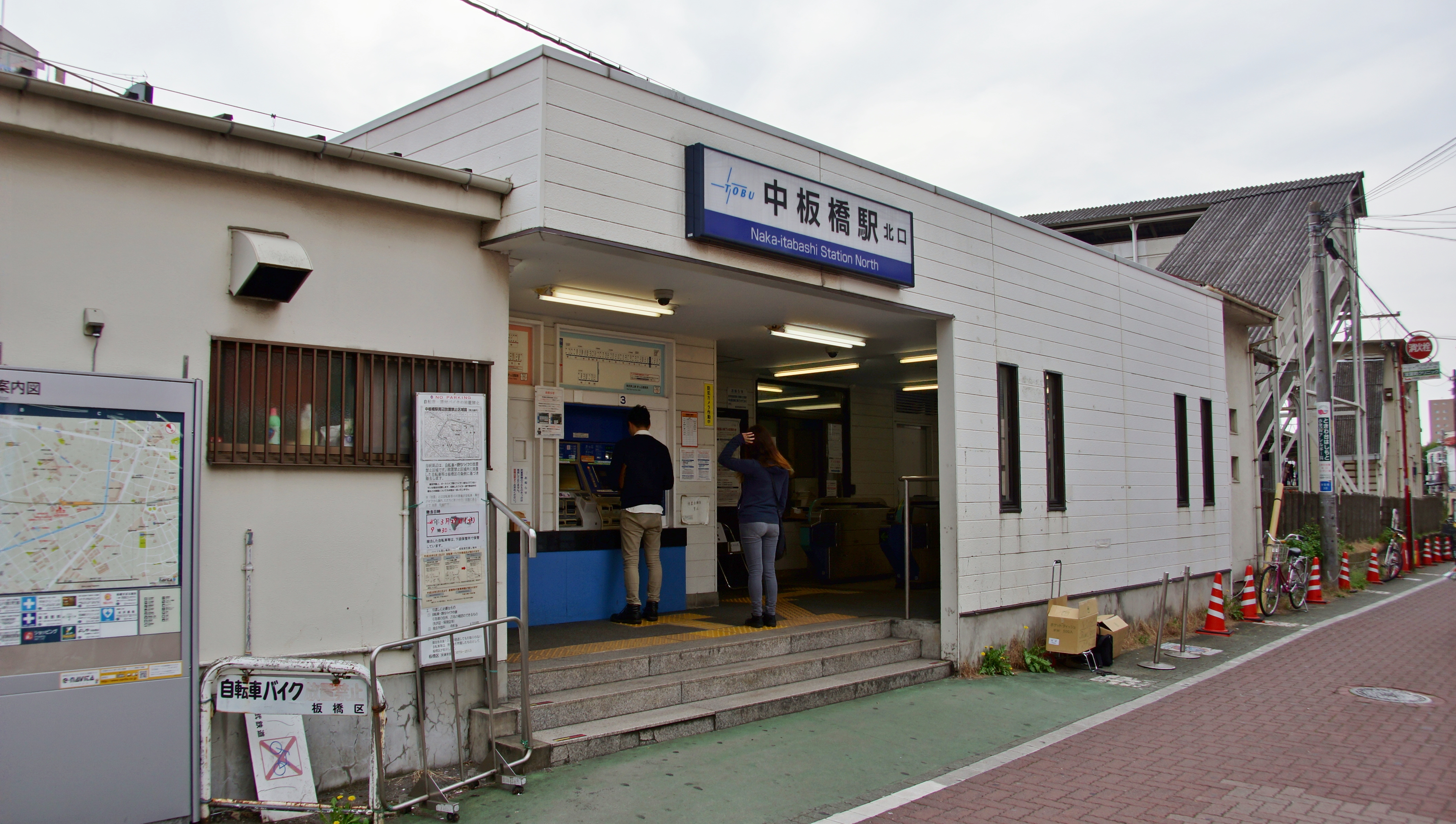
The north entrance in April 2016

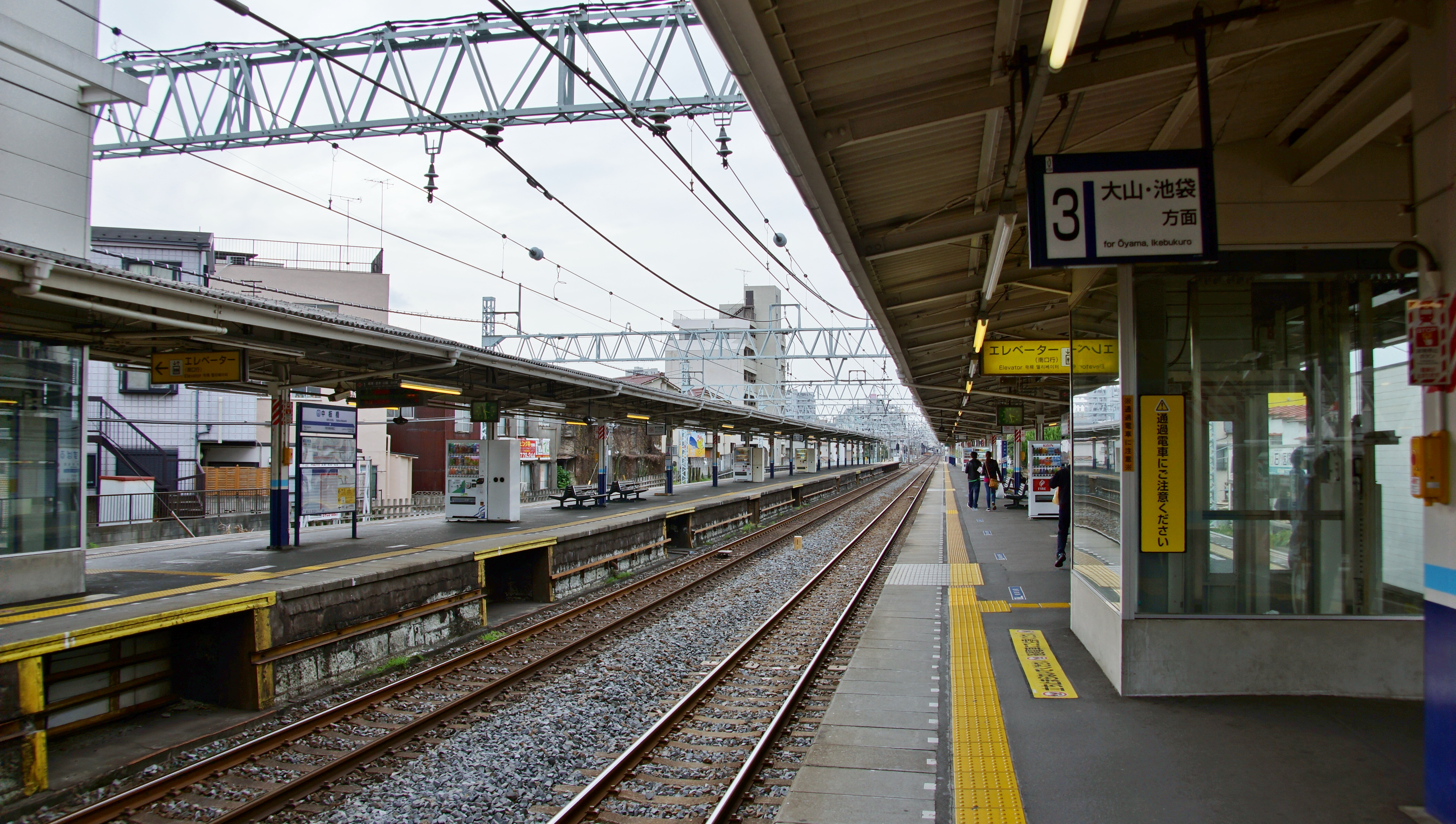
The up end of the platforms in April 2016

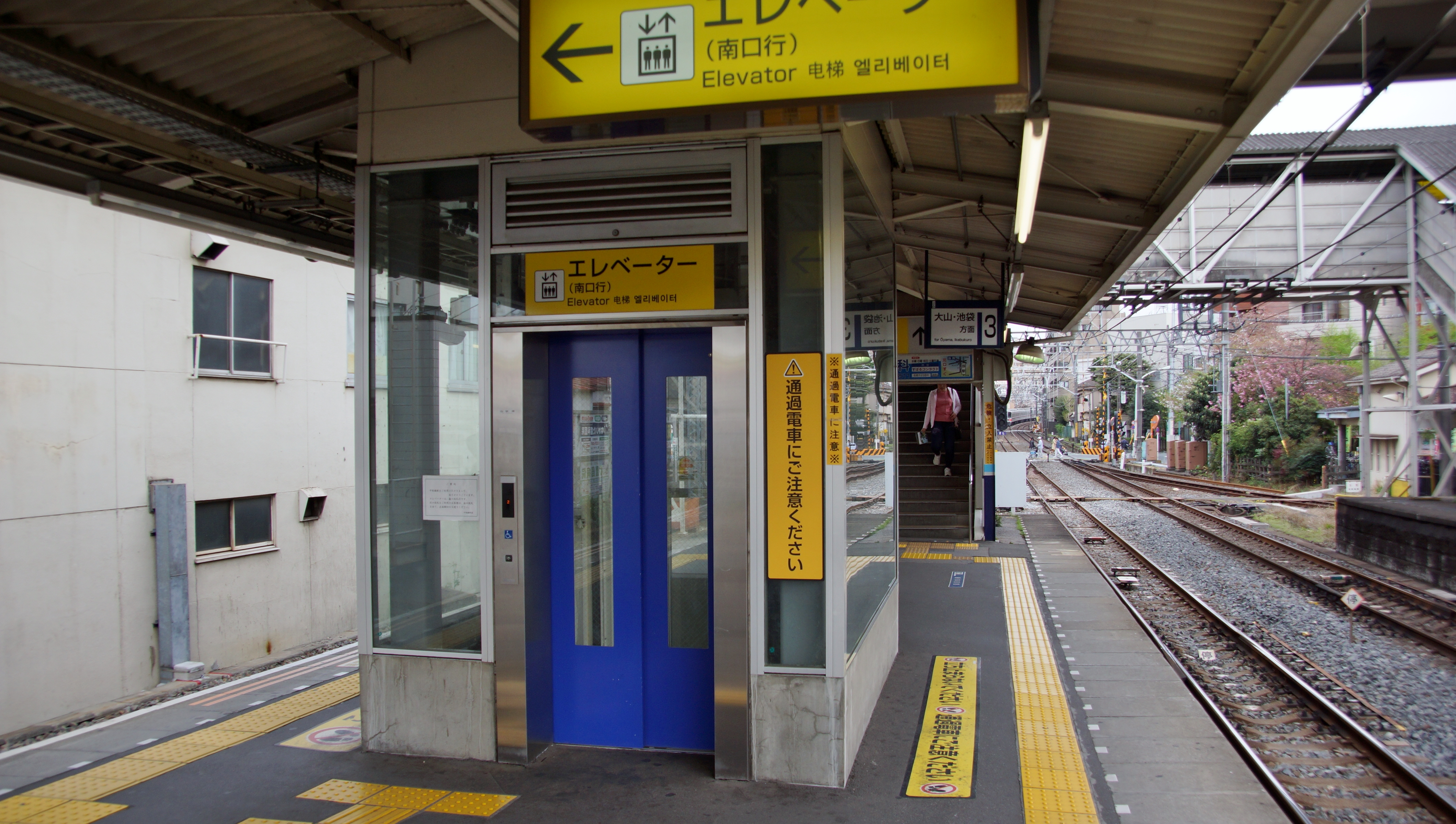
The passenger lift on platform 3/4 in April 2016

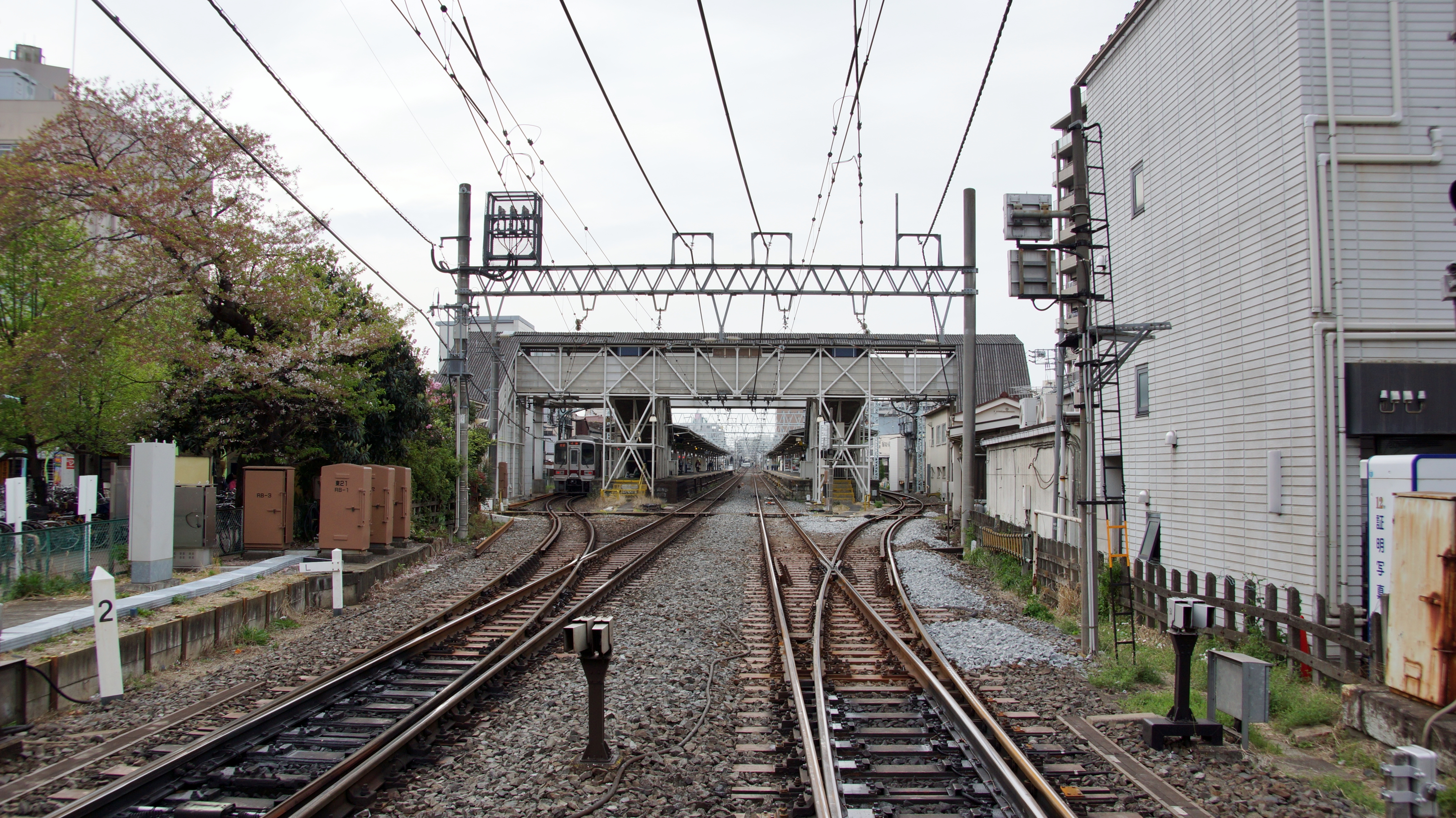
The station viewed from the level crossing at the east (Ikebukuro) end in April 2016

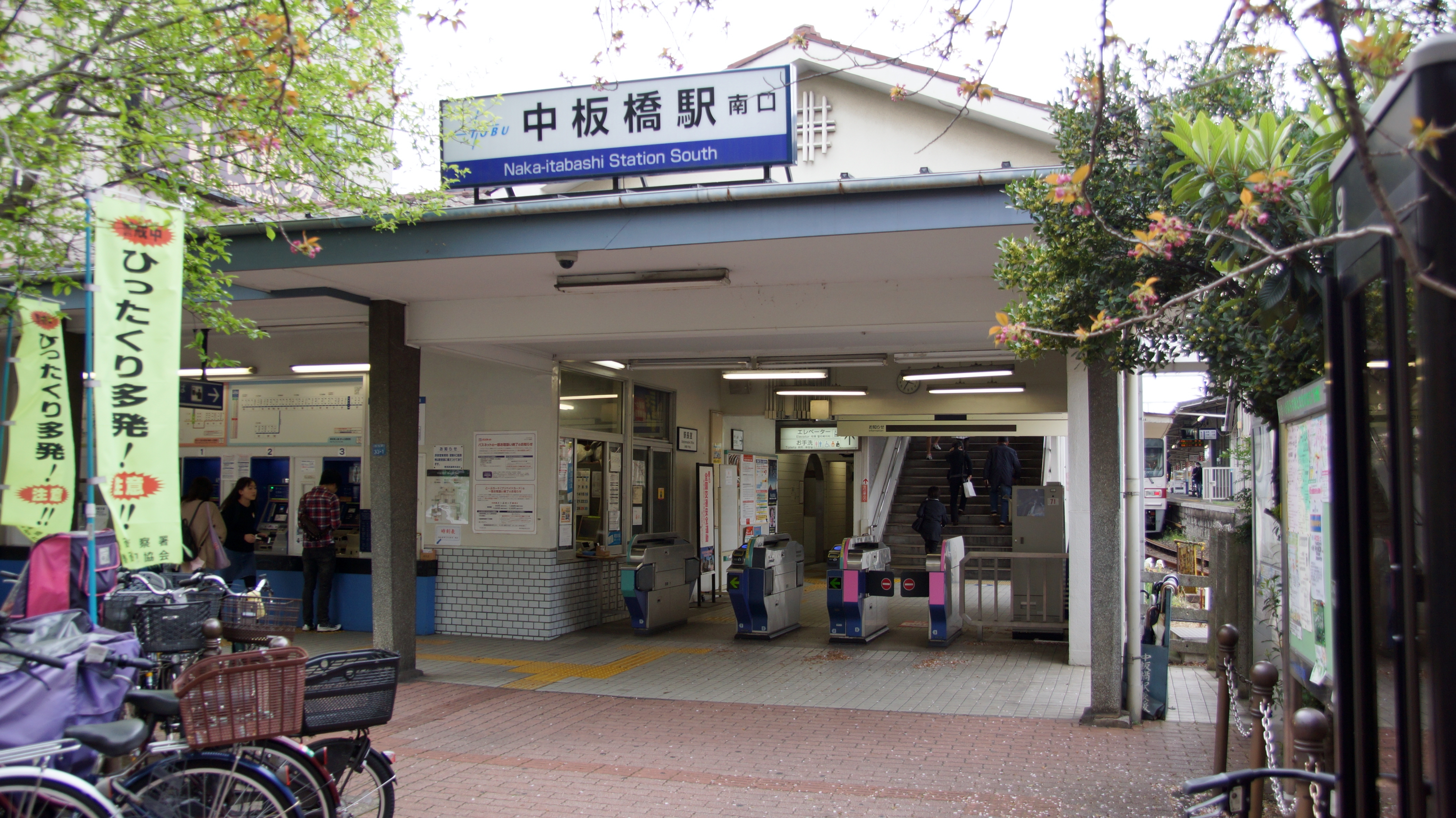
The south entrance in April 2016

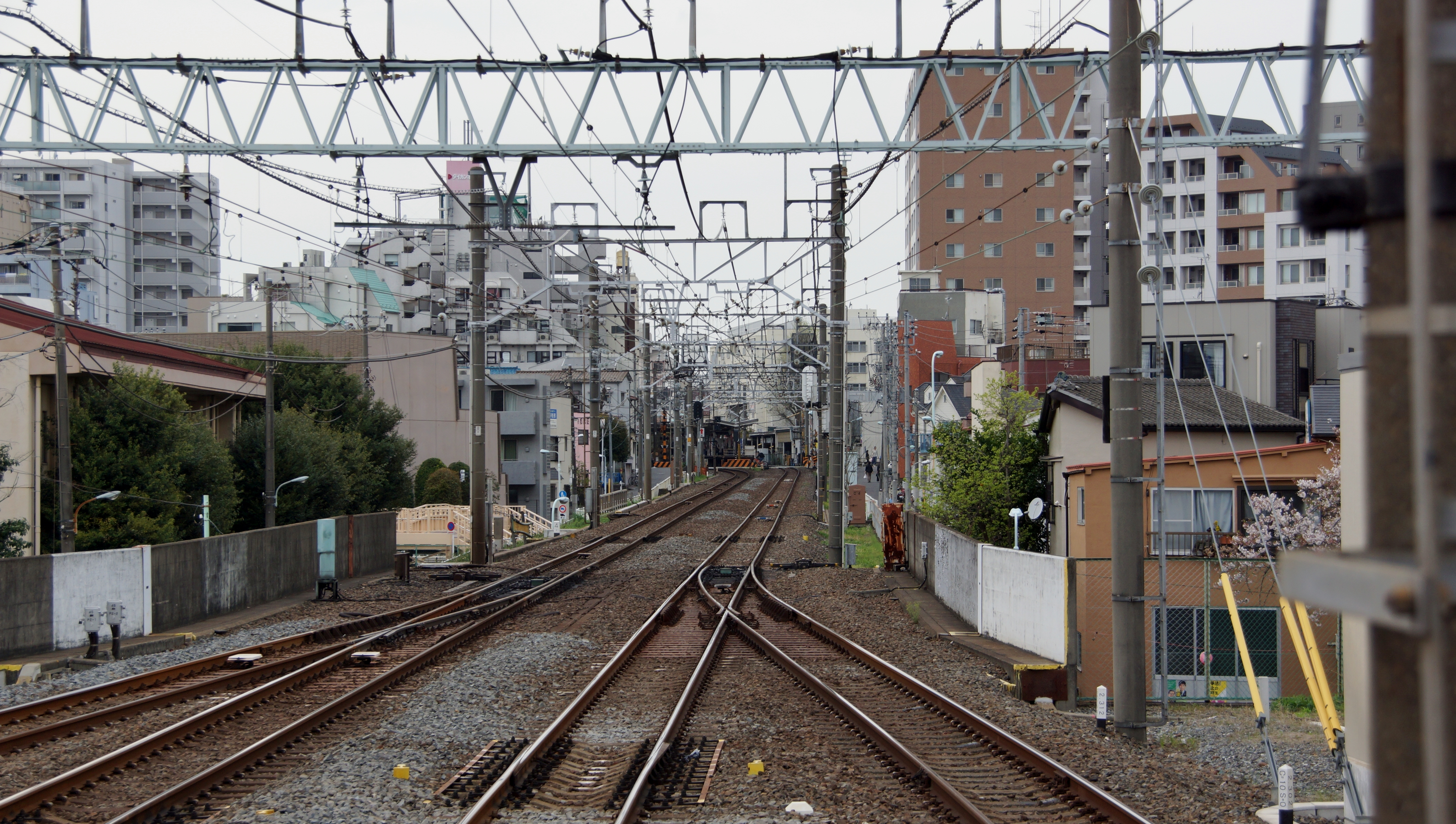
Tokiwadai Station visible from the end of the platforms in April 2016

== History ==
The station opened on 12 July 1933.

From 17 March 2012, station numbering was introduced on the Tobu Tojo Line, with Naka-Itabashi Station becoming "TJ-05".

== Passenger statistics ==
In fiscal 2014, the station was used by an average of 26,961 passengers daily. The passenger figures for previous years are as shown below.

Fiscal year	Daily average
2010	26,784
2011	25,978
2012	26,527
2013	27,093
2014	26,961

== Surrounding area ==
- Shakujii River

== See also ==
- List of railway stations in Japan
