= Shimo-Itabashi Station =

Railway station in Tokyo, Japan

TJ03 Shimo-Itabashi Station 下板橋駅
- The main (north) entrance in April 2026

General information
- Location: 4-43-11 Ikebukuro-honchō, Toshima-ku, Tokyo 171-0011; Japan
- Coordinates: 35°44′45″N 139°42′53″E
- Operator: Tobu Railway
- Line: Tobu Tojo Line
- Distance: 2.0 km from Ikebukuro
- Platforms: 2 side platforms
- Tracks: 2

Construction
- Structure type: At-grade
- Accessible: Yes

Other information
- Station code: TJ-03
- Website: Official website

History
- Opened: 1 May 1914; 112 years ago
- Rebuilt: 1935

Passengers
- FY2015: 15,728 daily

Services
Preceding station	Tobu Railway	Following station
Ōyama TJ04 towards Yorii	Tojo Line Local	Kita-Ikebukuro TJ02 towards Ikebukuro
Location
- Location within Japan

Shimo-Itabashi Station (下板橋駅, Shimo-Itabashi-eki; lit. "Lower Itabashi Station") is a railway station on the Tobu Tojo Line in Toshima, Tokyo, Japan, operated by the private railway operator Tobu Railway. Despite its name, the station is not actually located in Itabashi, Tokyo.

== Lines ==
Shimo-Itabashi Station is served by the Tobu Tojo Line from Ikebukuro in Tokyo. Located between Kita-Ikebukuro and Ōyama, it is 2.0 km from the Ikebukuro terminus. Only "Local" (all-stations) services stop at this station, with eight trains per hour in each direction during the daytime.

== Station layout ==
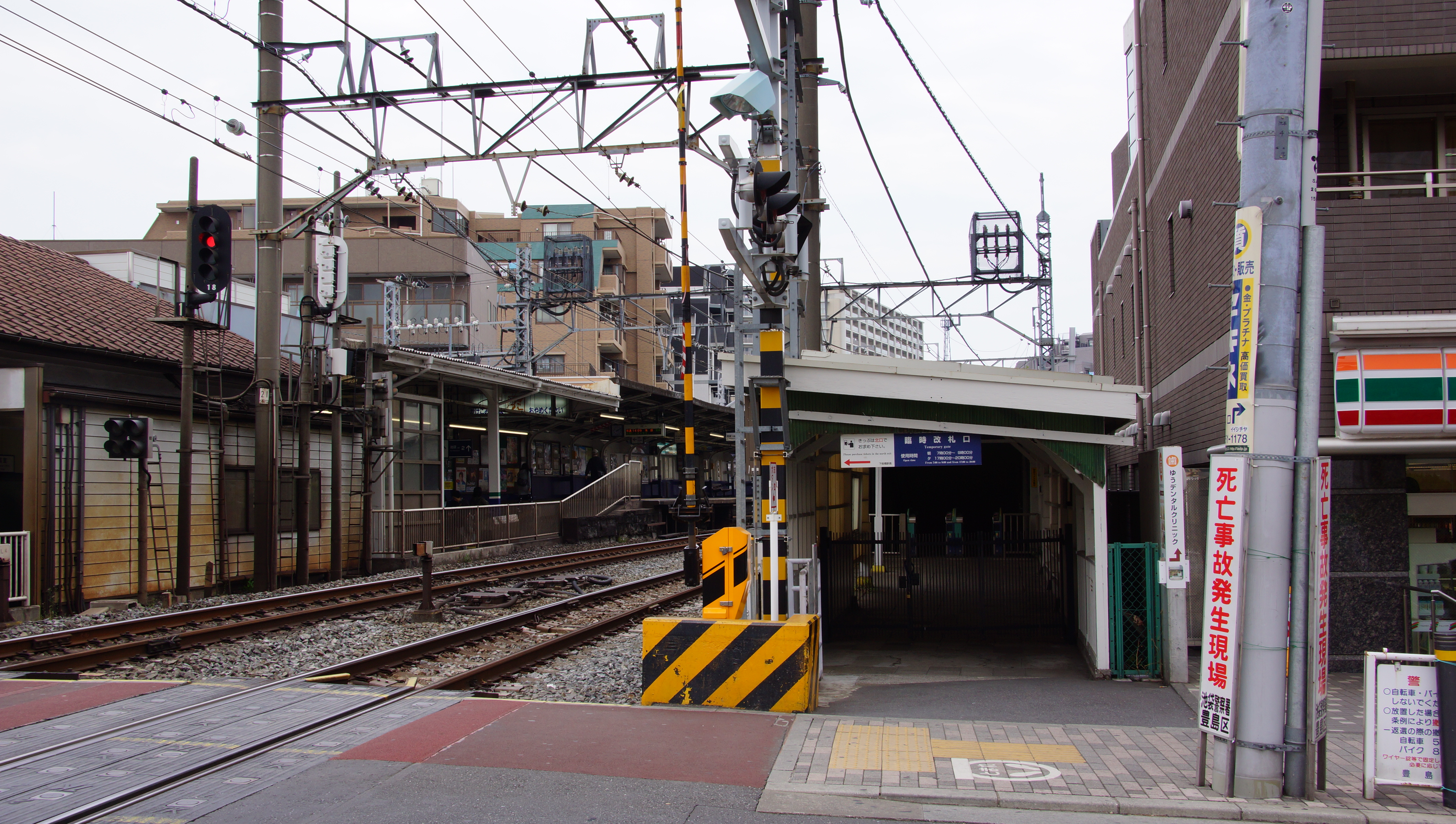
The south entrance, used during the morning and evening peaks only, April 2014

The station consists of two side platforms serving two tracks. The main (north) entrance leads directly onto the up (Ikebukuro-bound) platform 2, with passenger access to the down platform 1 via an underground passage. An additional entrance (south entrance) is open during the morning and evening peak hours. Toilet facilities are provided on platform 2.

=== Platforms ===
1	Tobu Tojo Line	for Kami-Itabashi, Narimasu, and Shiki
2	Tobu Tojo Line	for Ikebukuro

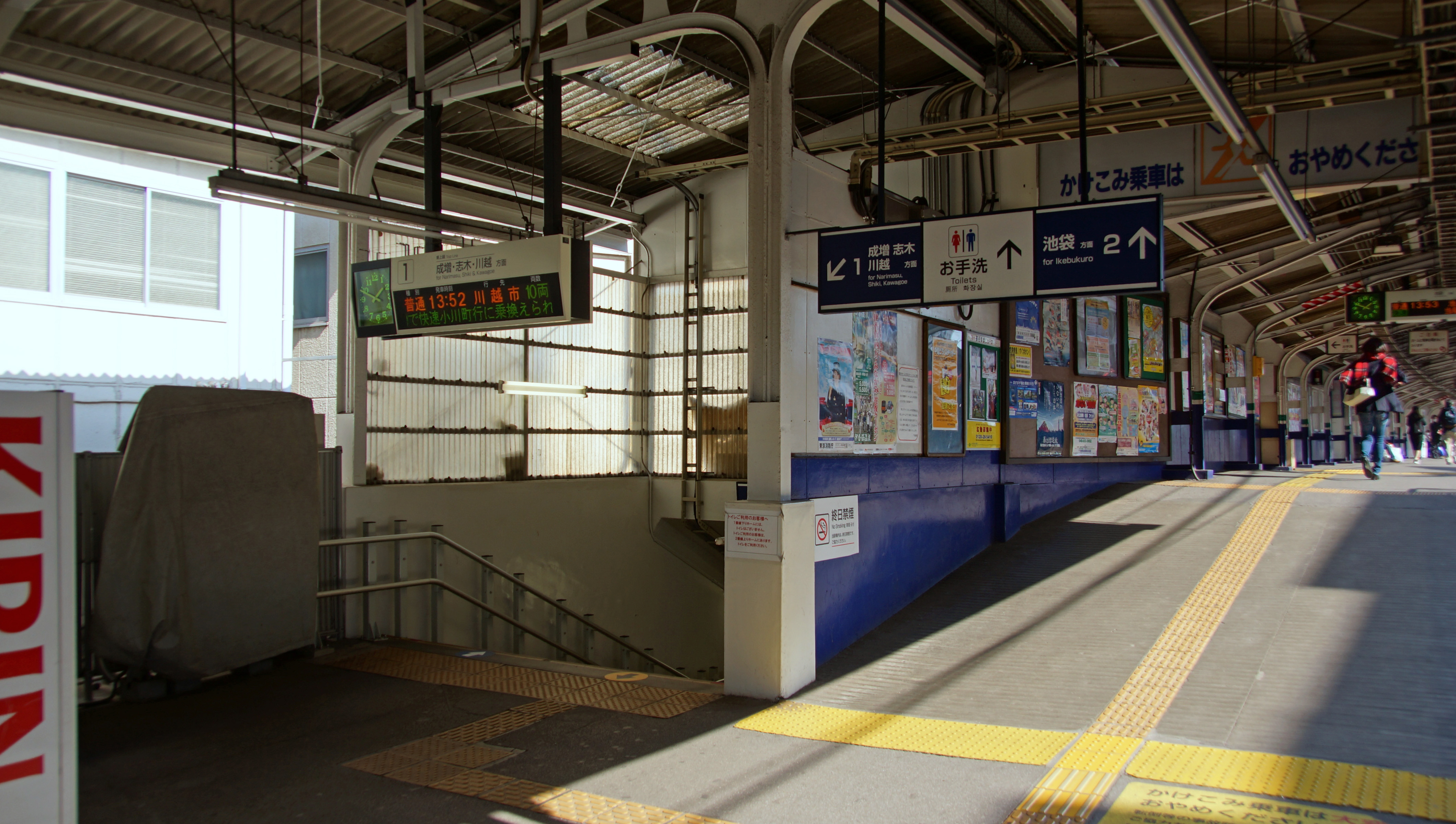
The stairs to the underpass from platform 2 to platform 1 in February 2017

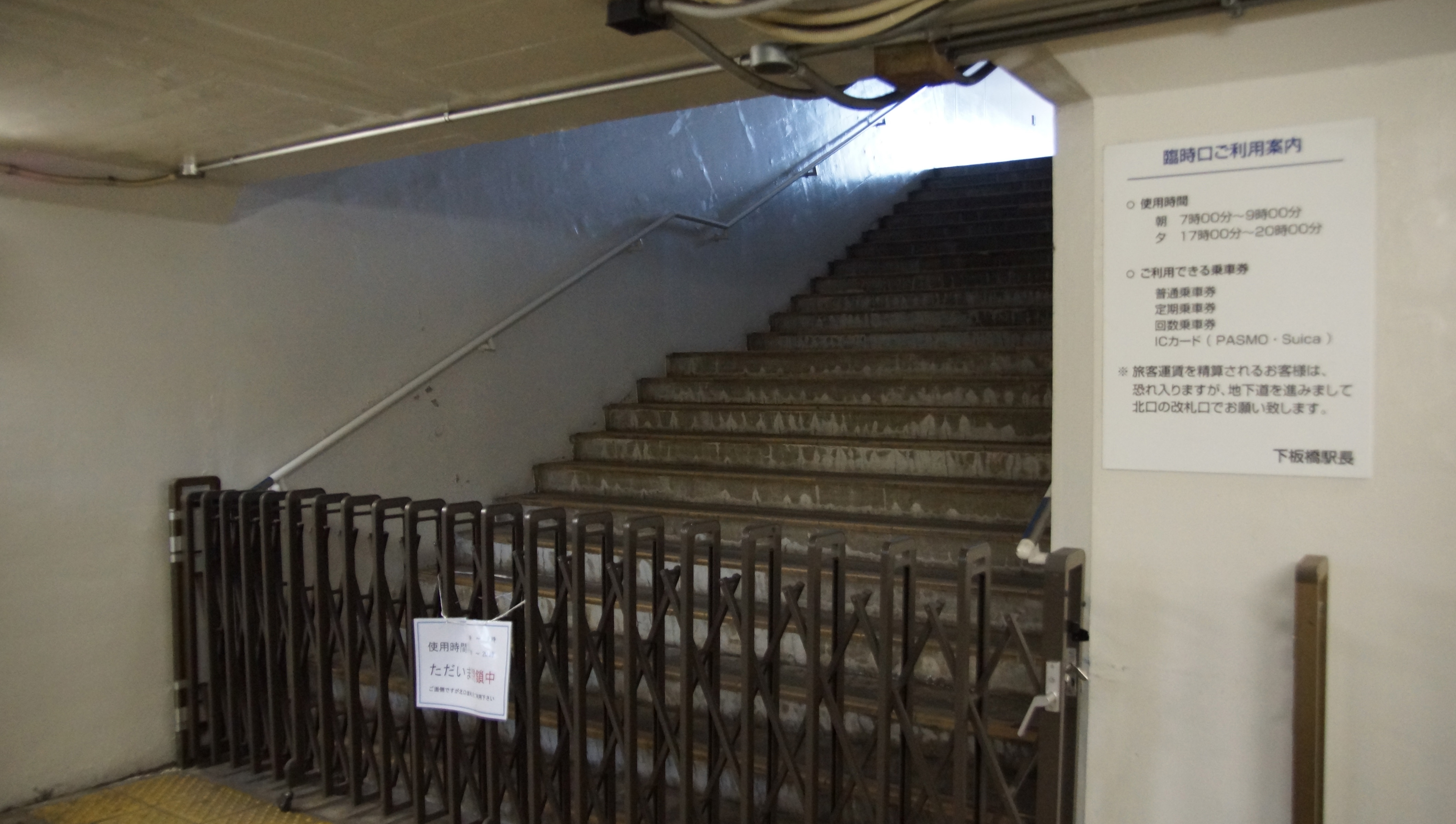
The stairs from the rush-hour only entrance leading to the underpass between the platforms in February 2017

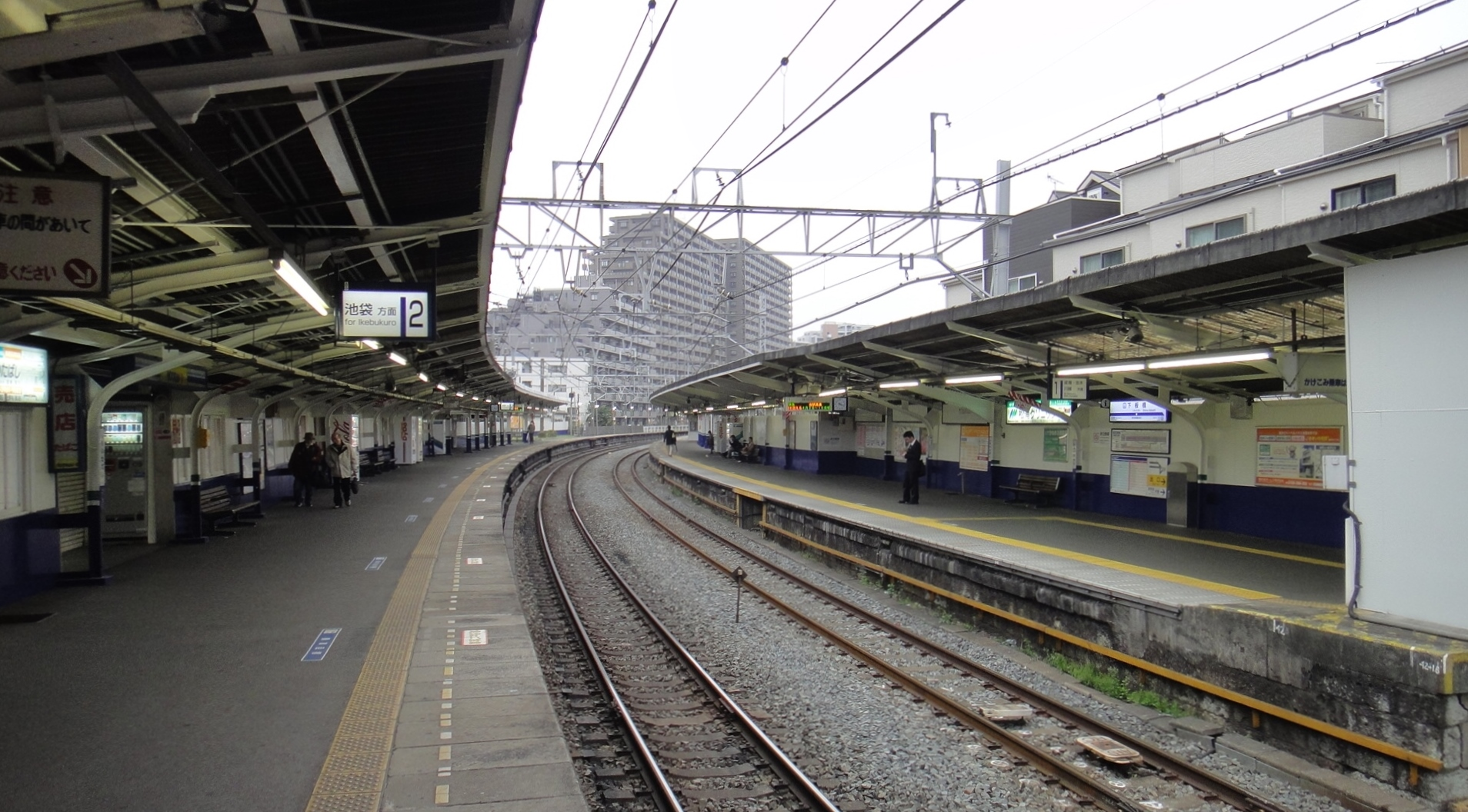
View from the Narimasu end of Platform 2 in March 2013

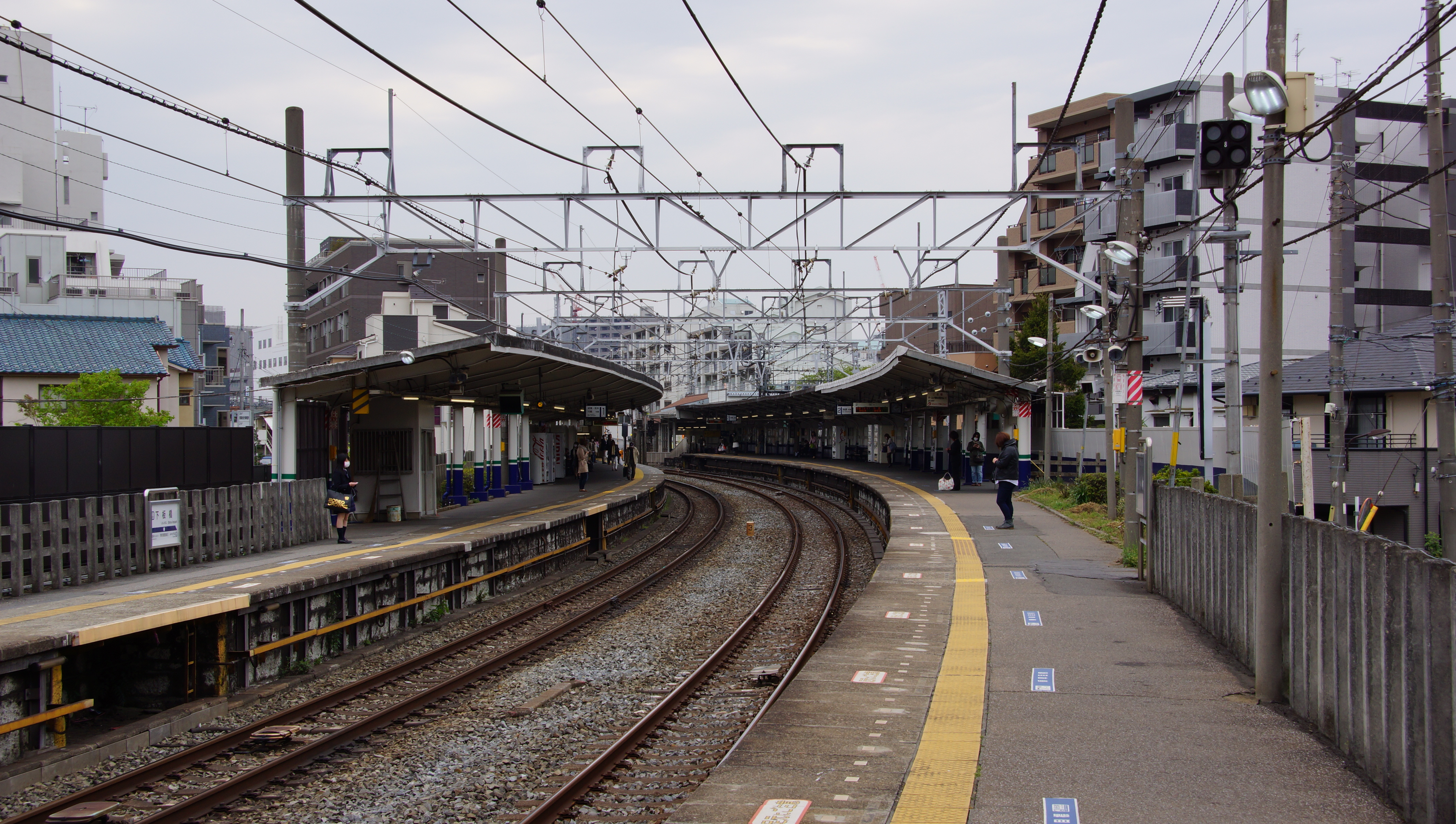
View from the Ikebukuro end of Platform 2 in April 2014

== History ==
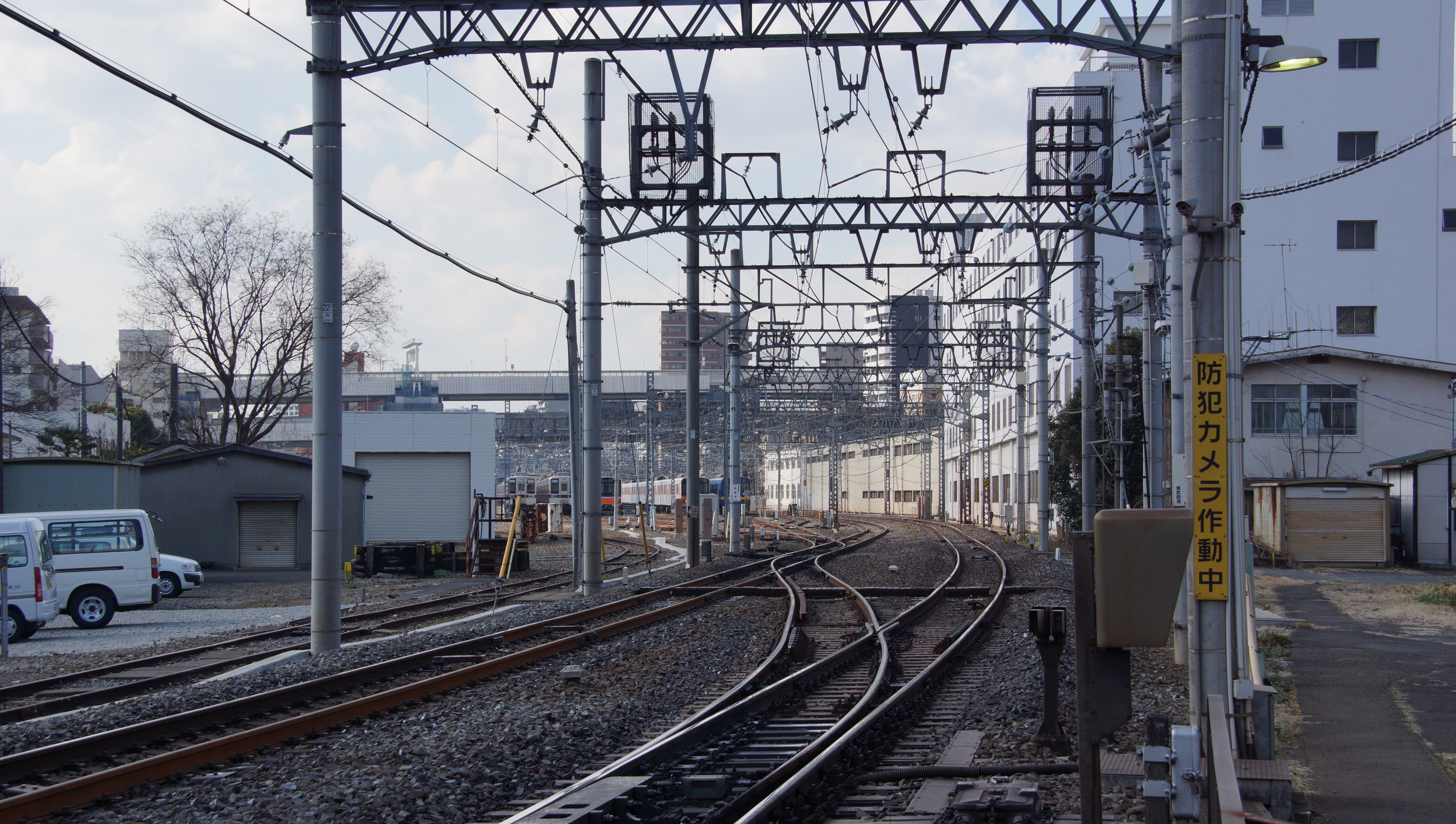
Shimo-Itabashi stabling sidings to the west of the station in February 2017

The station opened on 1 May 1914. At the time of its opening, the station was located in the town of Itabashi (later becoming Itabashi Ward), and took its name from the neighbourhood of Shimo-Itabashi adjacent to the station. The station was relocated in 1935, moving it across the boundary from Itabashi into Toshima. The site of the original station is now used as a stabling yard with capacity for up to eight trains, and the "0.0" kilometre post for the Tobu Tojo Line is located here.

From 17 March 2012, station numbering was introduced on the Tobu Tojo Line, with Shimo-Itabashi Station becoming "TJ-03".

== Passenger statistics ==
In fiscal 2010, the station was used by an average of 14,986 passengers daily.

== Surrounding area ==
- Itabashi Station (JR Saikyo Line, 10 minutes' walk)
- Shin-Itabashi Station ( Toei Mita Line, 15 minutes' walk)

== See also ==
- List of railway stations in Japan
