= Tokiwadai Station (Tokyo) =

Railway station in Japan

Coordinates: 35°45′31″N 139°41′23″E

TJ06 Tokiwadai Station ときわ台駅
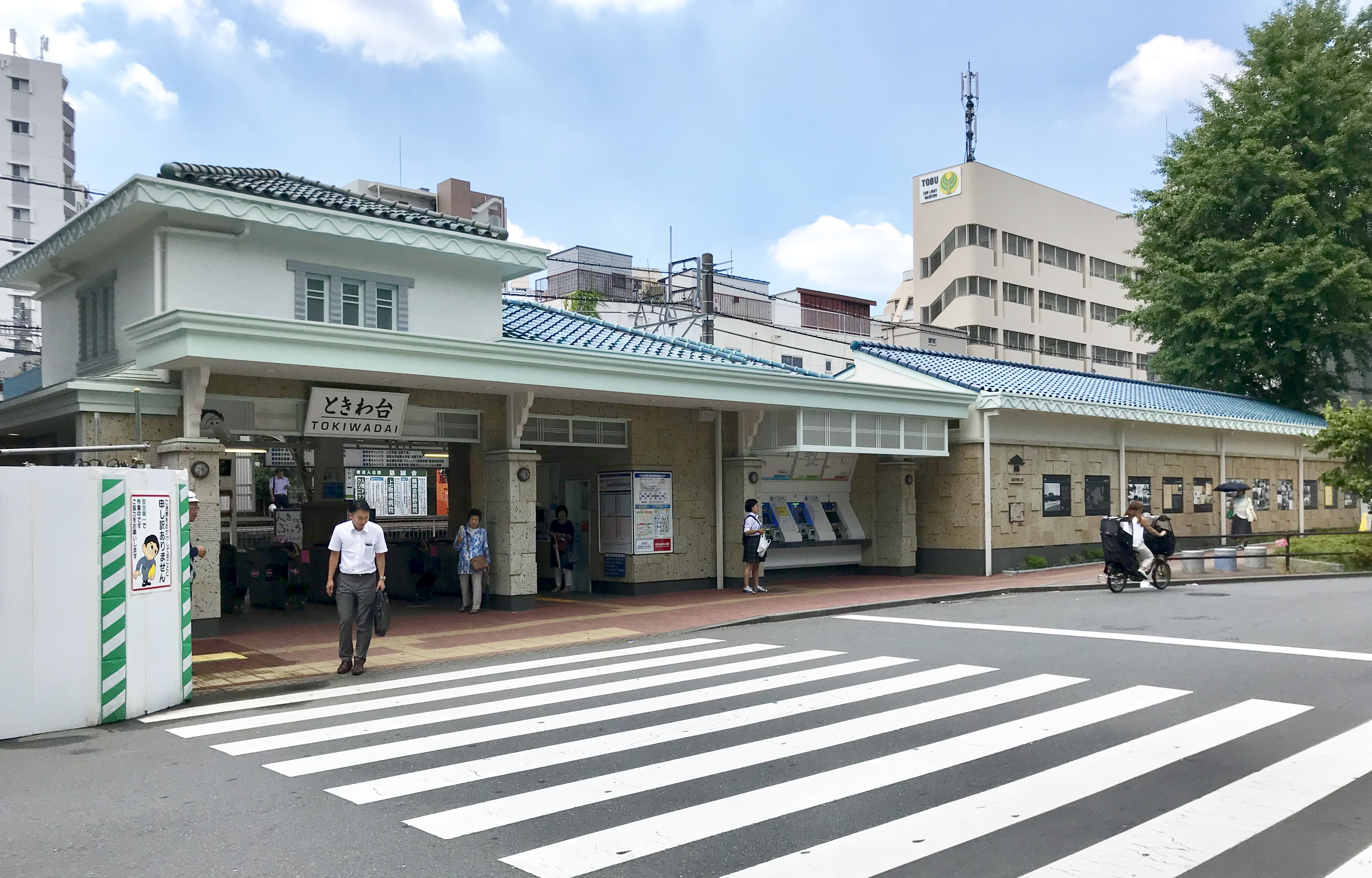
- The north entrance in August 2019

General information
- Location: 1-43-1 Tokiwadai, Itabashi-ku, Tokyo 174-0071; Japan
- Operator: Tobu Railway
- Line: Tobu Tojo Line
- Distance: 4.7 km from Ikebukuro
- Platforms: 1 island platform
- Tracks: 2
- Connections: Bus stop

Other information
- Station code: TJ-06
- Website: www.tobu.co.jp/station/info/7205.html

History
- Opened: 20 October 1935; 90 years ago
- Former names: Musashino-Tokiwa (until 1951)

Passengers
- FY2010: 46,297 daily

Services
Preceding station	Tobu Railway	Following station
Kami-Itabashi TJ07 towards Yorii	Tojo Line Local	Naka-Itabashi TJ05 towards Ikebukuro
Location
- Location within Japan

Tokiwadai Station (ときわ台駅, Tokiwadai-eki) is a railway station on the Tobu Tojo Line in Itabashi, Tokyo, Japan, operated by the private railway operator Tobu Railway.

== Lines ==
Tokiwadai Station is served by the Tobu Tojo Line from Ikebukuro in Tokyo. Located between Naka-Itabashi and Kami-Itabashi, it is 4.7 km from the Tokyo terminus at Ikebukuro Station. Only "Local" (all-stations) services stop at this station, with eight trains per hour in each direction during the daytime.

== Station layout ==
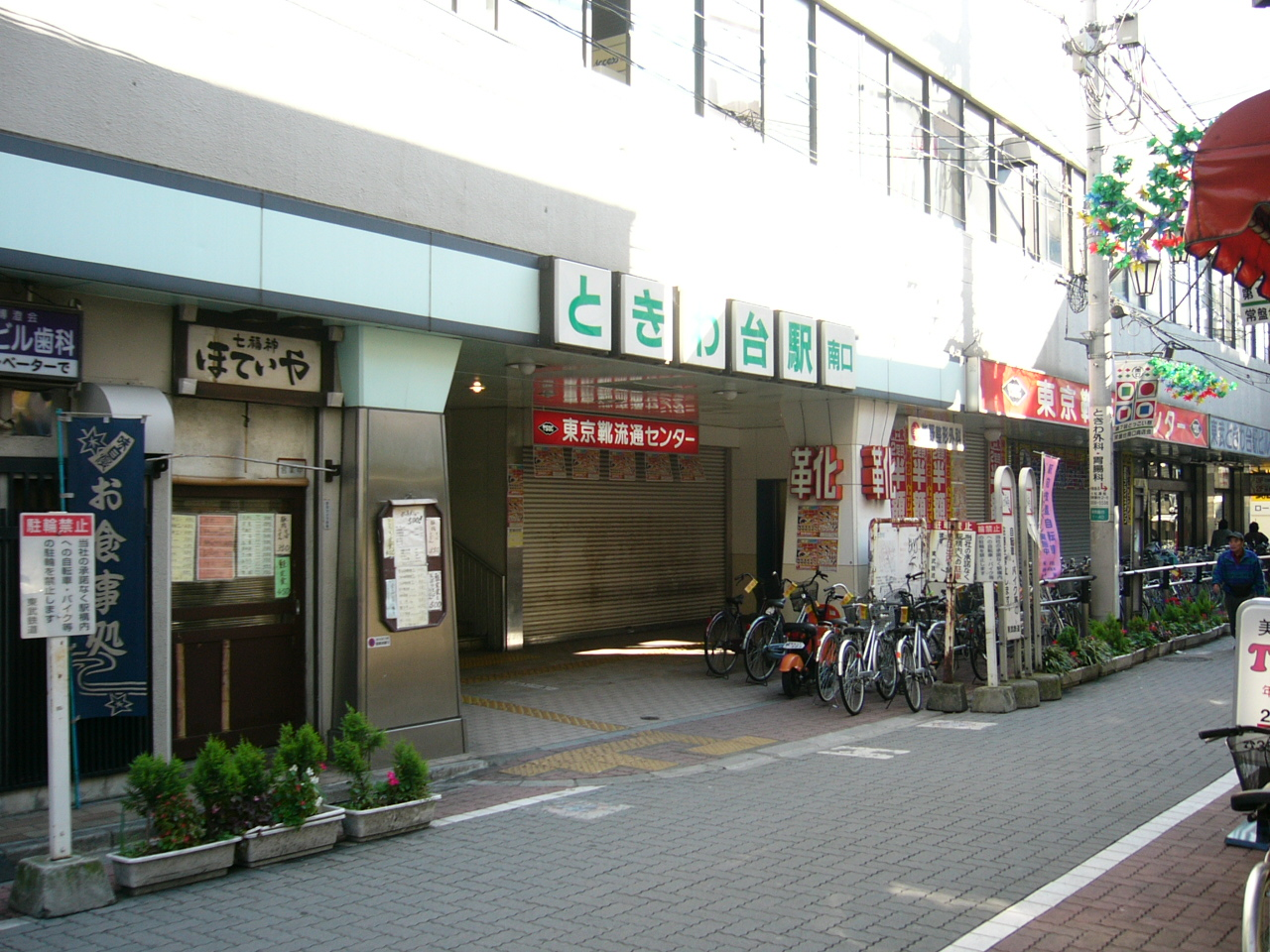
The south entrance in November 2004

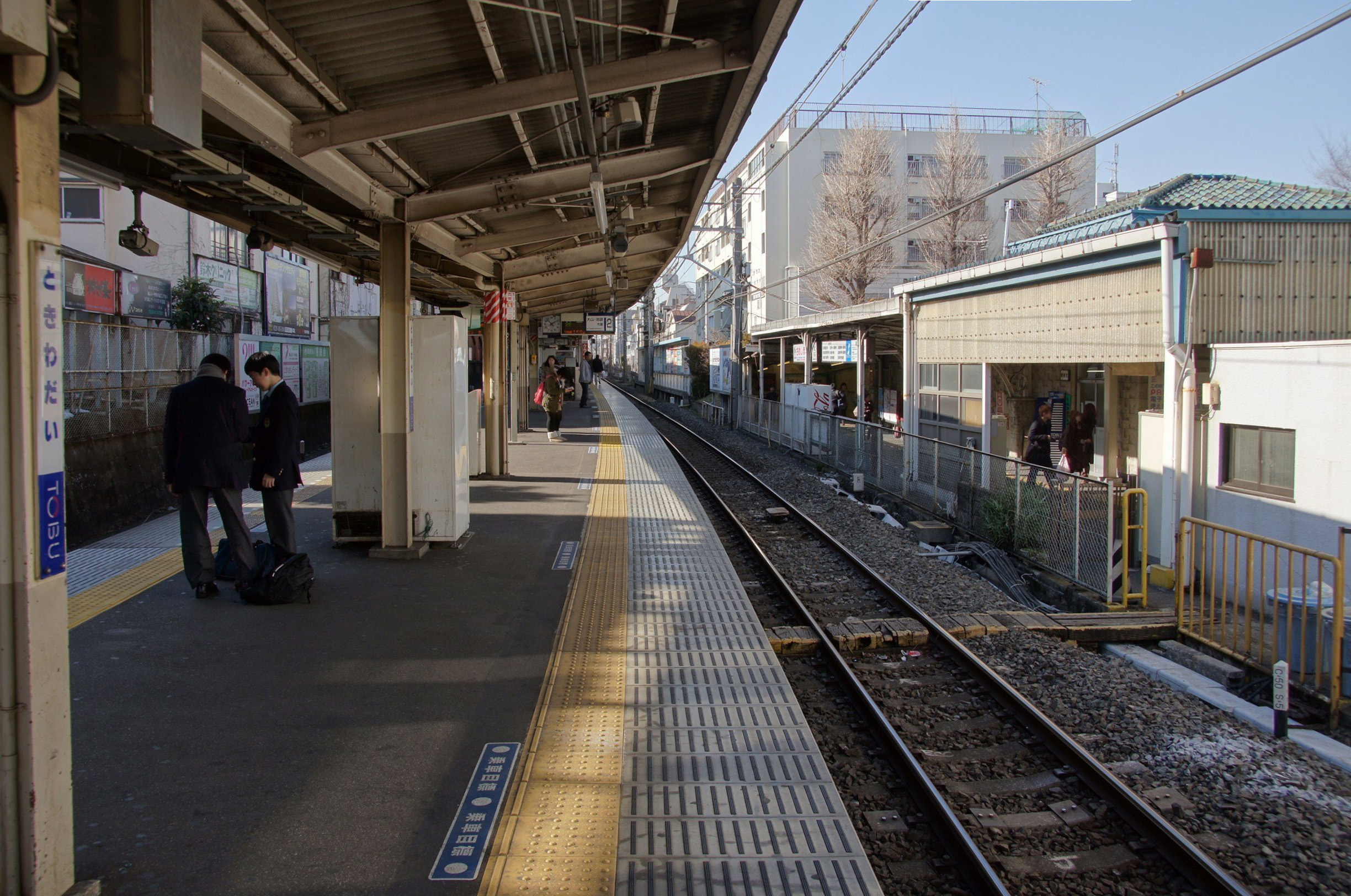
View of the platforms from the up (Ikebukuro) end, with the station building and north entrance on the right, February 2012

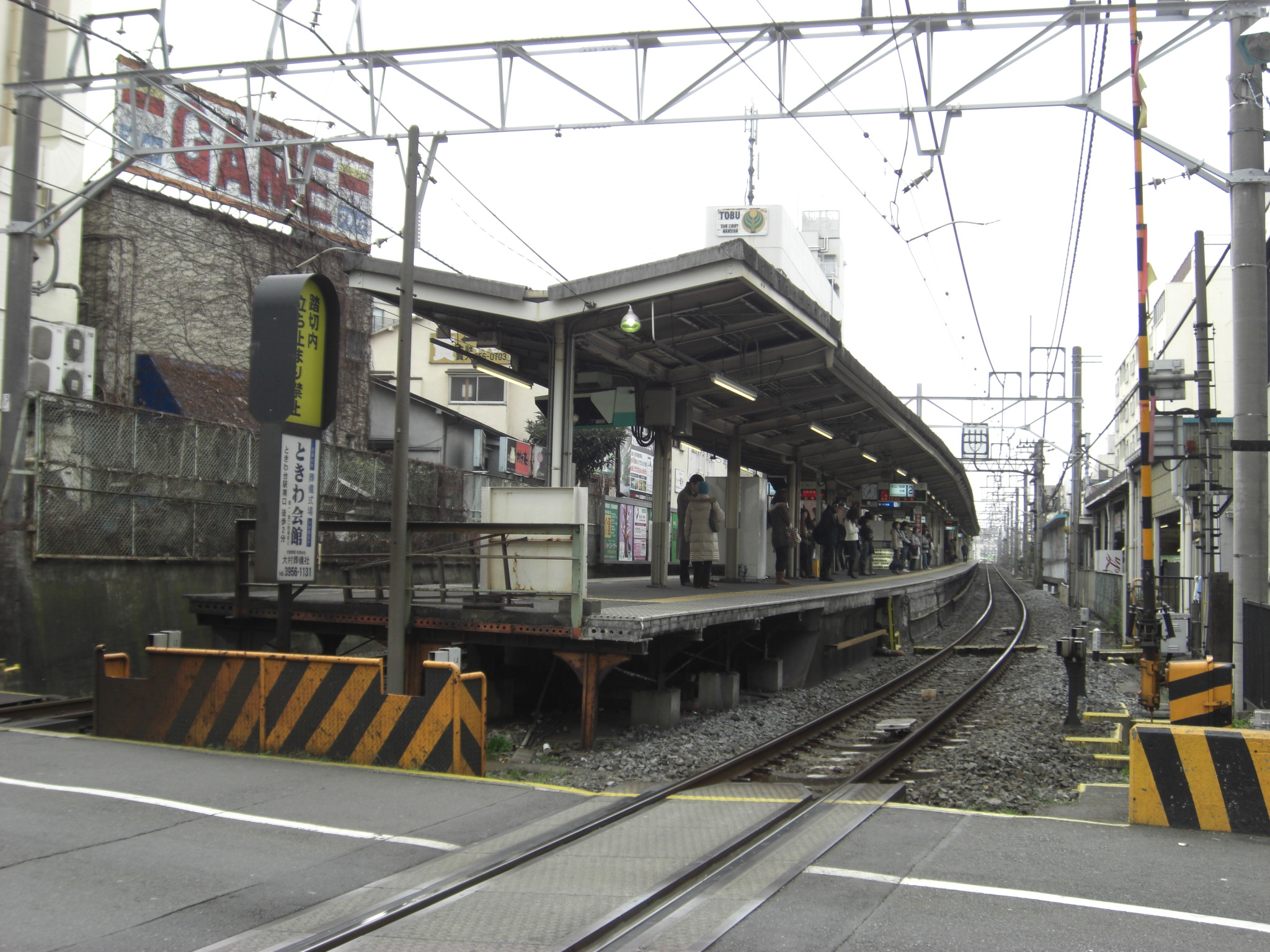
View of the platforms from the adjacent level crossing in February 2009

The station consists of a single island platform serving two tracks. Entrances are located on the north and south sides of the station. The station has universal access toilet facilities.

=== Platforms ===
1	Tobu Tojo Line	for Kami-Itabashi, Narimasu, and Shiki
2	Tobu Tojo Line	for Ōyama and Ikebukuro

== History ==
The station opened on 20 October 1935 as Musashino-Tokiwa Station (武蔵野常盤駅). It was renamed Tokiwadai on 1 October 1951.

From 17 March 2012, station numbering was introduced on the Tobu Tojo Line, with Tokiwadai Station becoming "TJ-06".

== Passenger statistics ==
In fiscal 2010, the station was used by an average of 46,297 passengers daily.

== Accidents ==
Tokiwadai Station suffers from a high number of suicides, due to the relatively high speed and frequency of non-stop trains passing through the station. Between 2002 and 2009, three people were killed by passing trains after jumping onto the tracks.

On 6 February 2007 at around 19:30, a police officer from a nearby Kōban police box was hit by a non-stop express train near Tokiwadai Station while trying to restrain a 39-year-old woman who had rushed onto the tracks in a suicide attempt. The woman survived with serious injuries, but the 53-year-old police officer, Sergeant Kunihiko Miyamoto, was left critically injured in a coma and died on 12 February.

== Surrounding area ==
- Poppins Nursery School (within station building, from 1 April 2012)
- Shinmei Shrine
- Itabashi-ku Chuo Library
- Itabashi-ku Tokiwadai Elementary School
- Nippon Shodo Museum

== See also ==
- List of railway stations in Japan
