= Ōyama Station (Tokyo) =

Railway station in Tokyo, Japan

Coordinates: 35°44′54.5″N 139°42′9″E

TJ04 Ōyama Station 大山駅
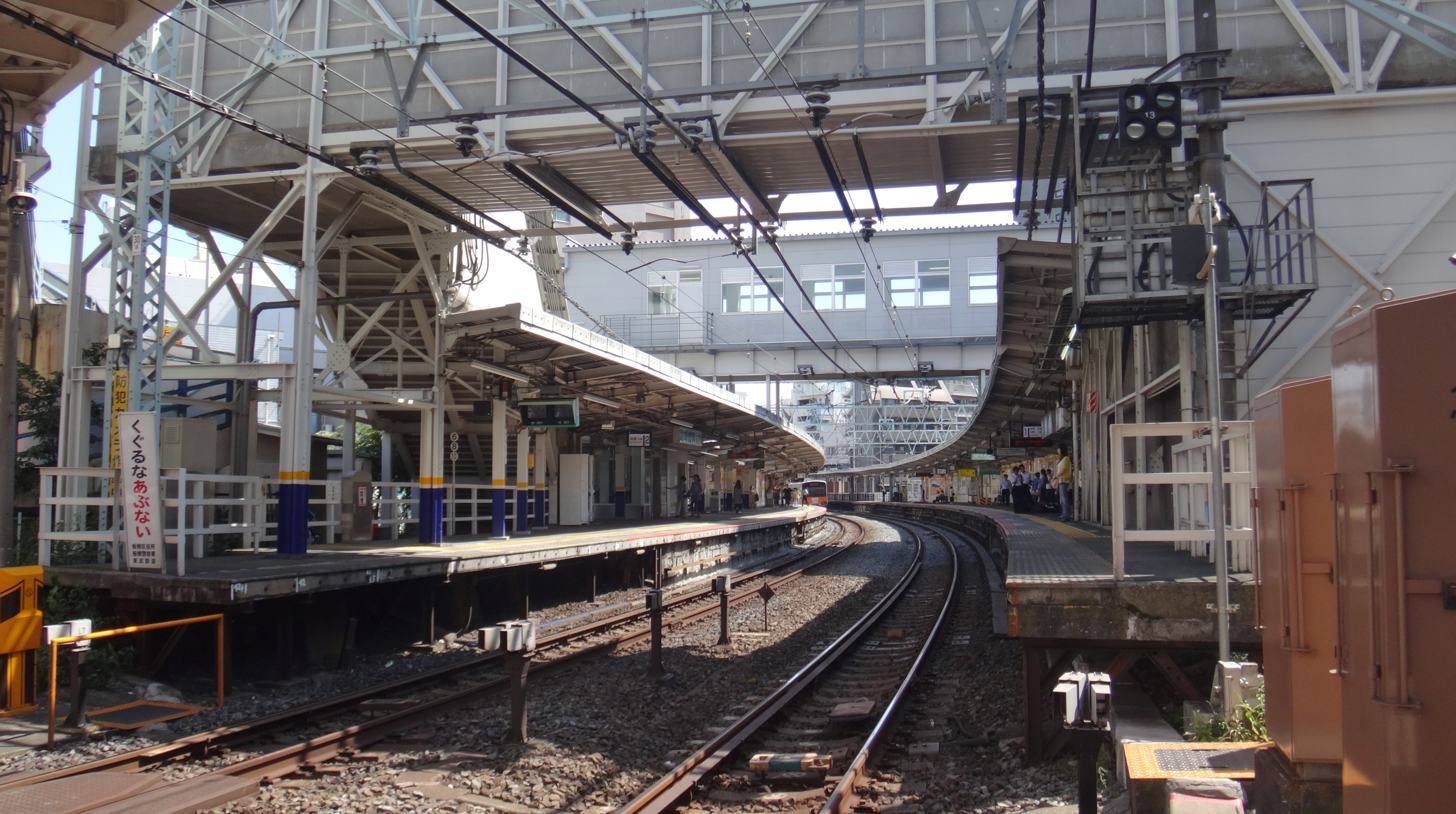
- The station as viewed from the level crossing at the west (down) end of the station, September 2015

General information
- Location: 4-1 Ōyama-chō, Itabashi-ku, Tokyo; Japan
- Operator: Tobu Railway
- Line: Tobu Tojo Line
- Distance: 3.0 km from Ikebukuro
- Platforms: 2 side platforms
- Tracks: 2

Construction
- Structure type: Ground station
- Accessible: Yes

Other information
- Station code: TJ-04
- Website: Official website

History
- Opened: 25 August 1931; 95 years ago

Passengers
- 46,727 per day (FY2010)

Services
Preceding station	Tobu Railway	Following station
Naka-Itabashi TJ05 towards Yorii	Tojo Line Local	Shimo-Itabashi TJ03 towards Ikebukuro
Location
- Location within Japan

Ōyama Station (大山駅, Ōyama-eki) is a railway station on the Tobu Tojo Line in Tokyo, Japan, operated by the private railway operator Tobu Railway.

== Lines ==
Ōyama Station is served by the Tobu Tojo Line from Ikebukuro in Tokyo. Located between Shimo-Itabashi and Naka-Itabashi, it is 3.0 km from the Ikebukuro terminus. Only "Local" (all-stations) services stop at this station, with eight trains per hour in each direction during the daytime.

== Station layout ==
The station consists of two side platforms serving two tracks. The station has three entrances: the south and east entrances adjoining platform 1, and the north entrance adjoining platform 2. Access between the platforms is provided by a footbridge at the west (down) end of the platforms and also be a separate footbridge with lift access. Toilet facilities are provided on both platforms.

=== Platforms ===
1	Tobu Tojo Line	for Kami-Itabashi, Narimasu, and Shiki
2	Tobu Tojo Line	for Shimo-Itabashi and Ikebukuro

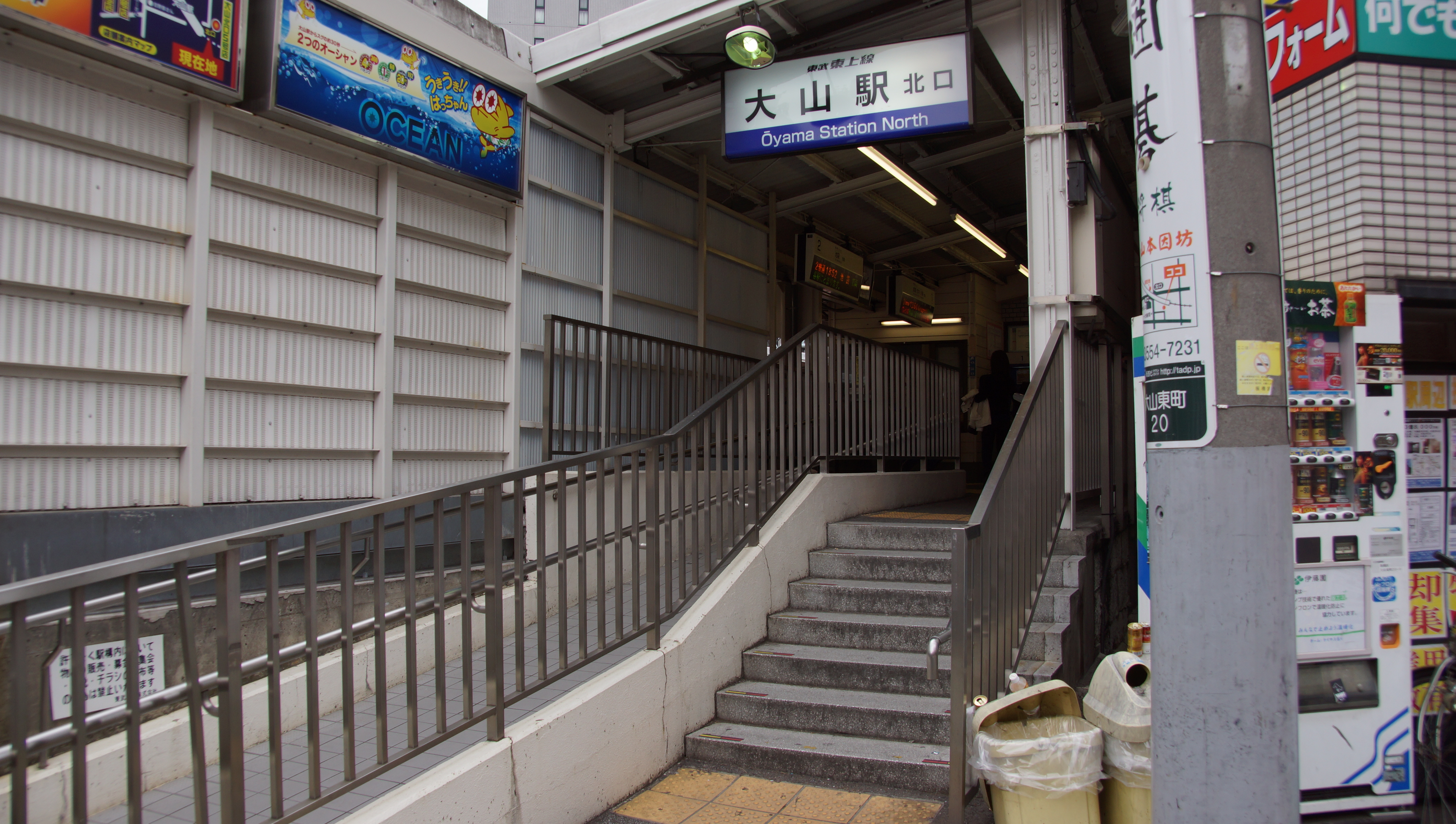
The north entrance in April 2014

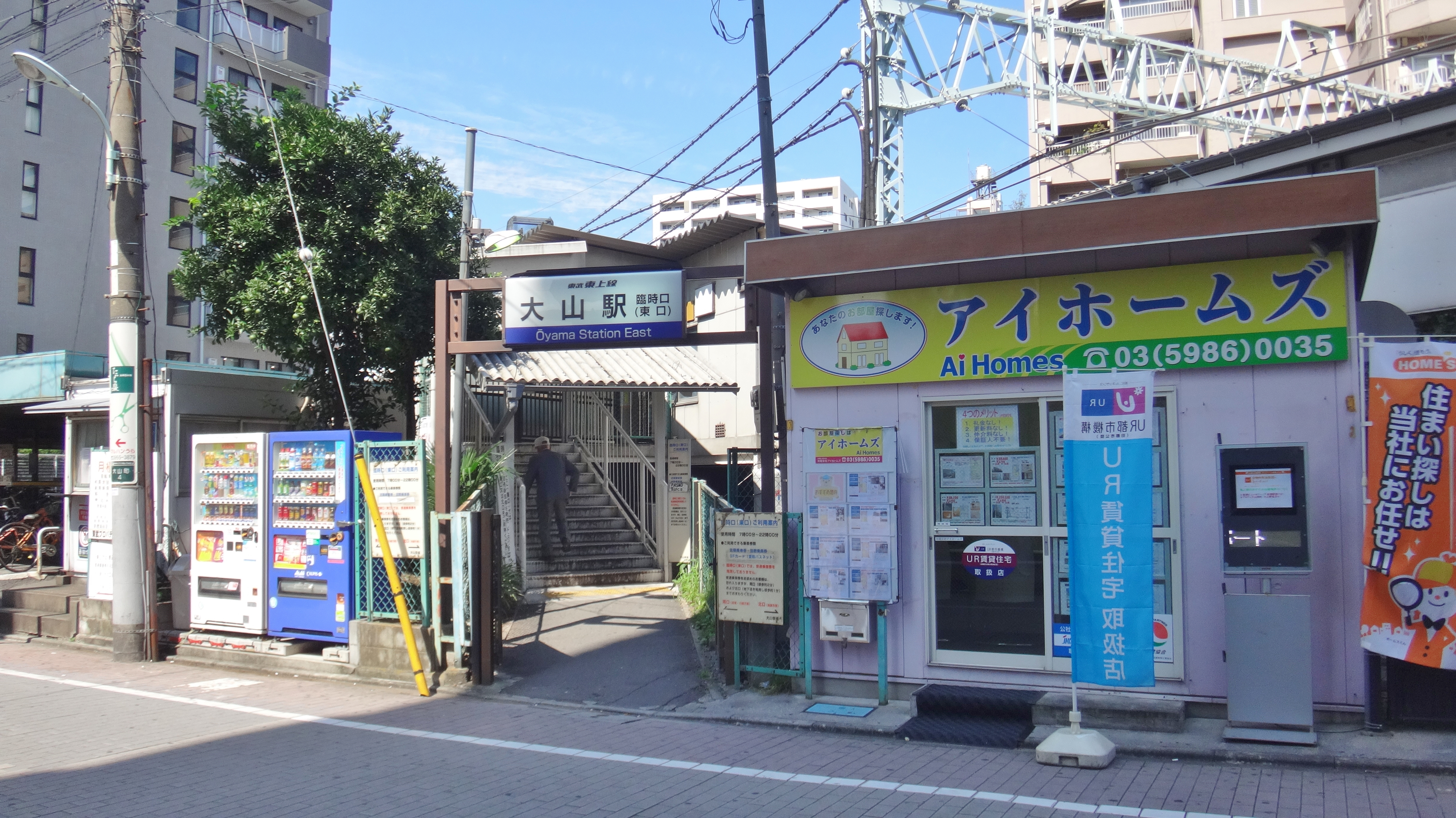
The east entrance in September 2015

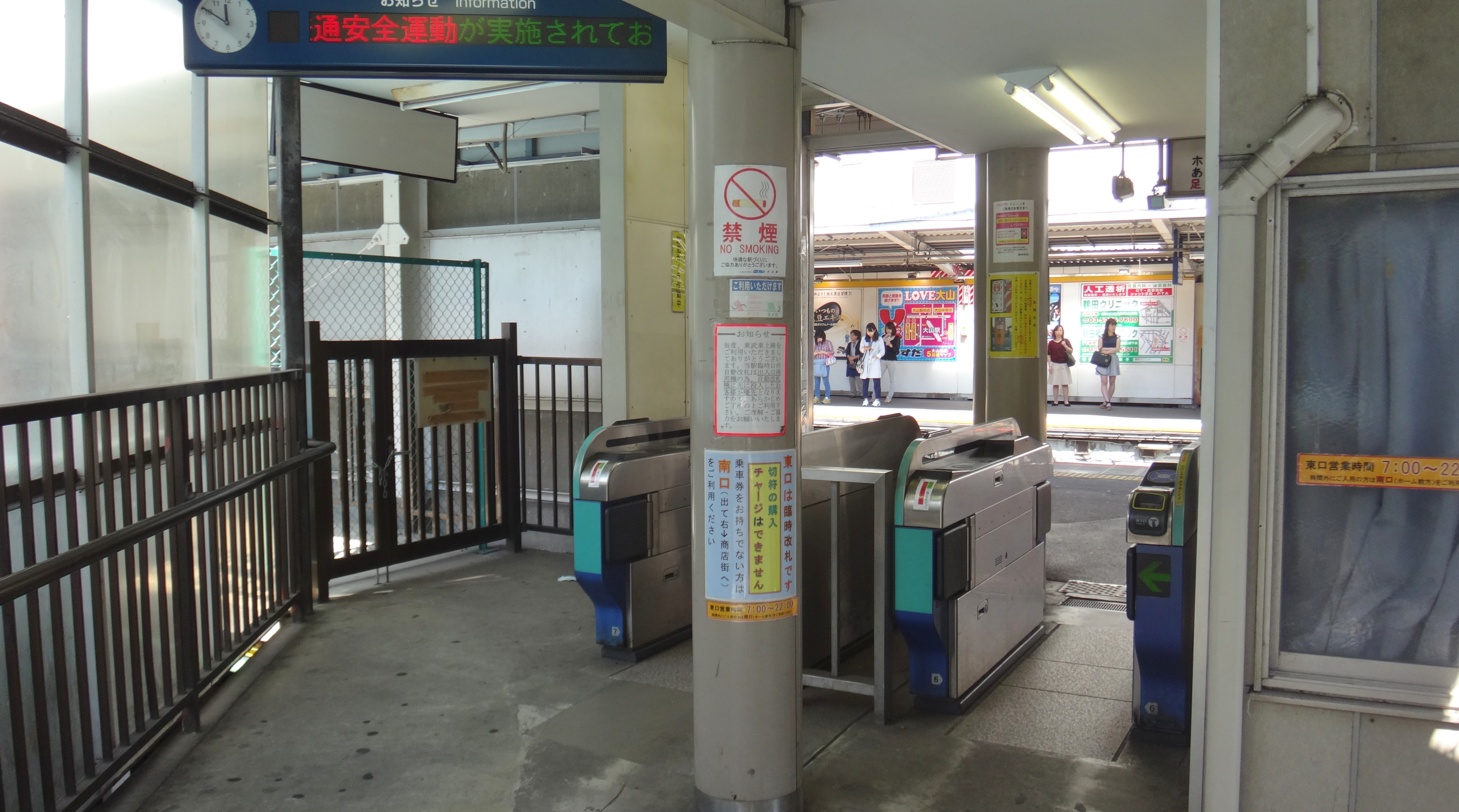
The ticket barriers leading to the platform at the east entrance, September 2015

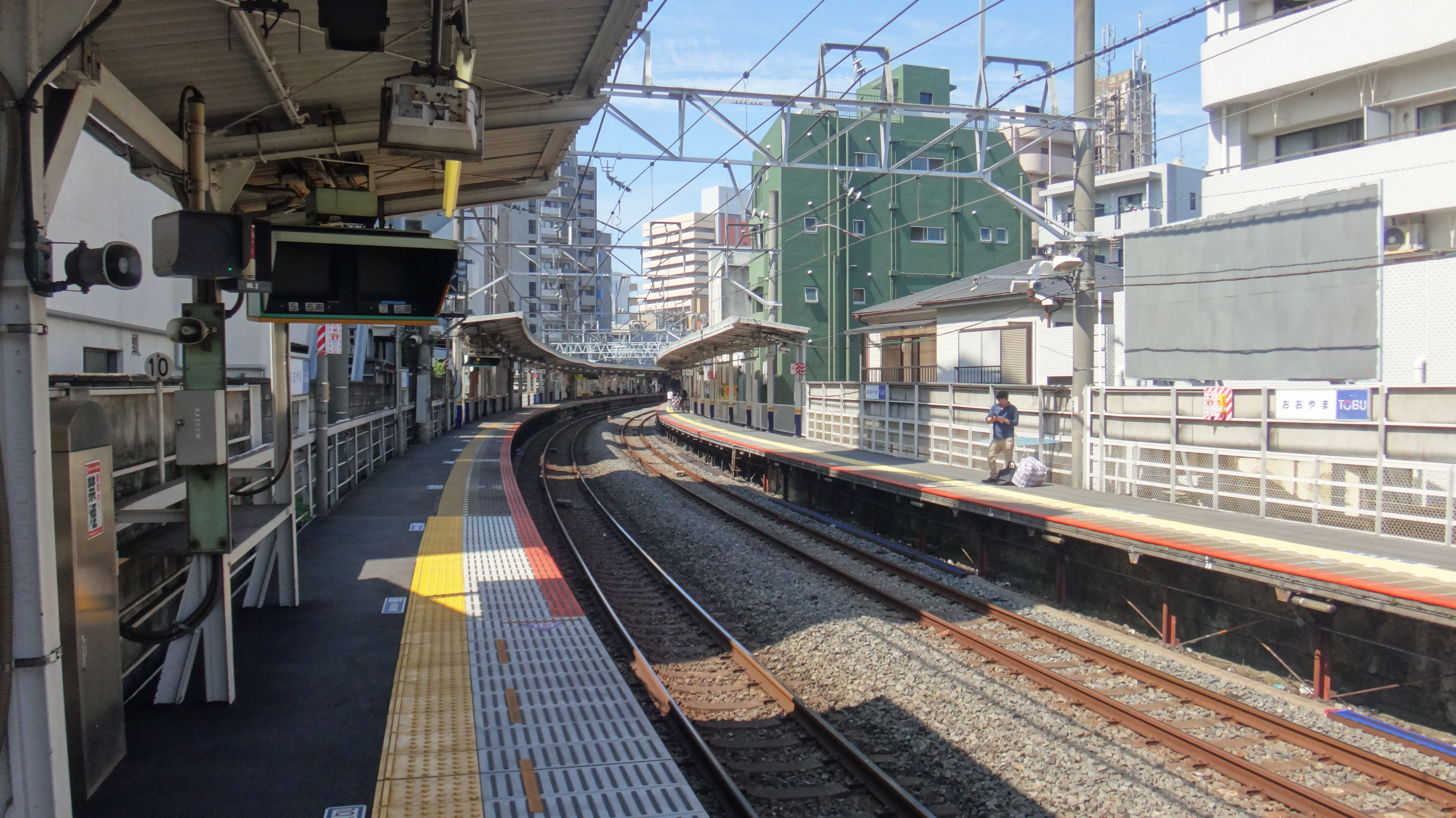
The platforms looking west from the up end of platform 1 in September 2015

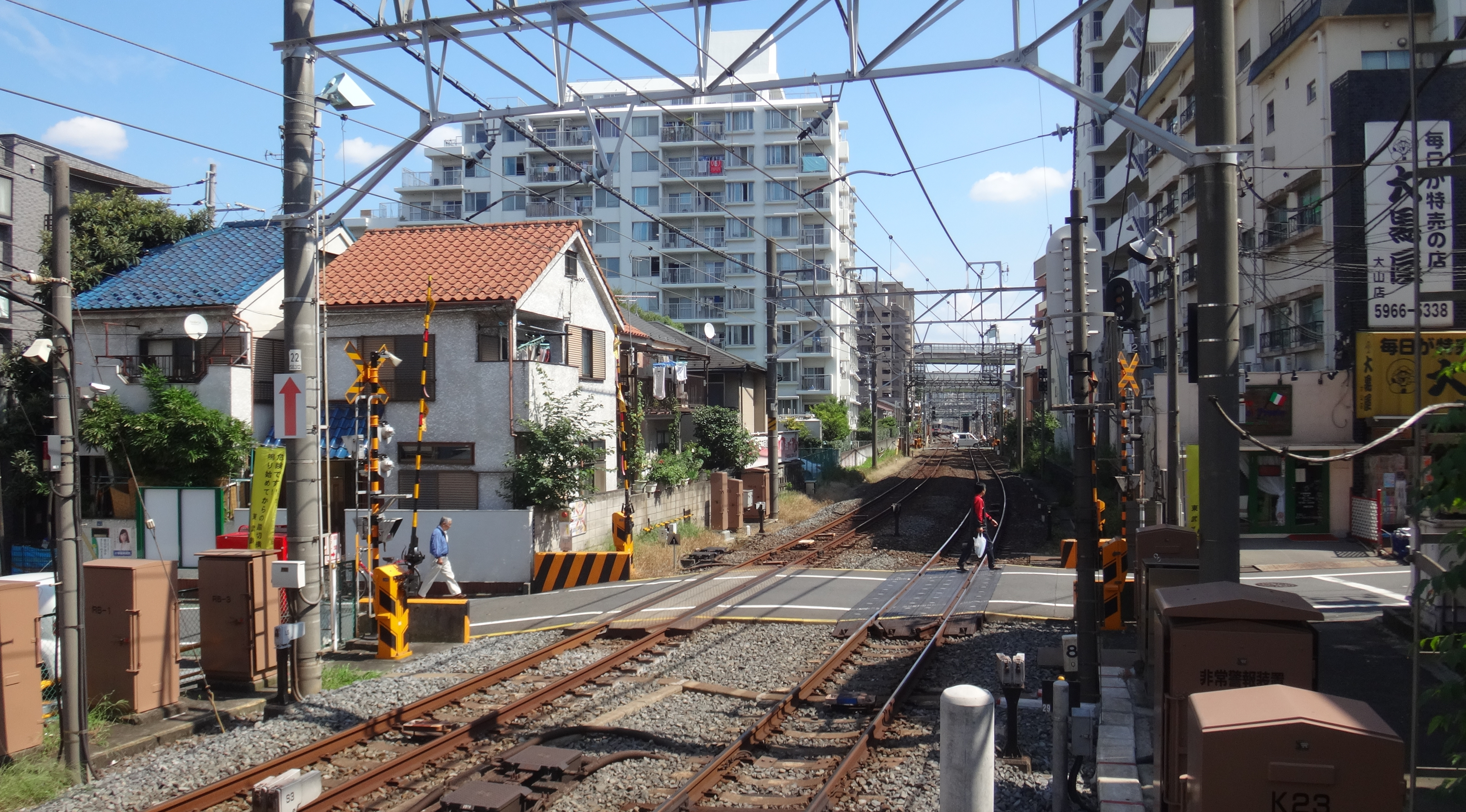
The view looking from the Ikebukuro end of platform 1 in September 2015

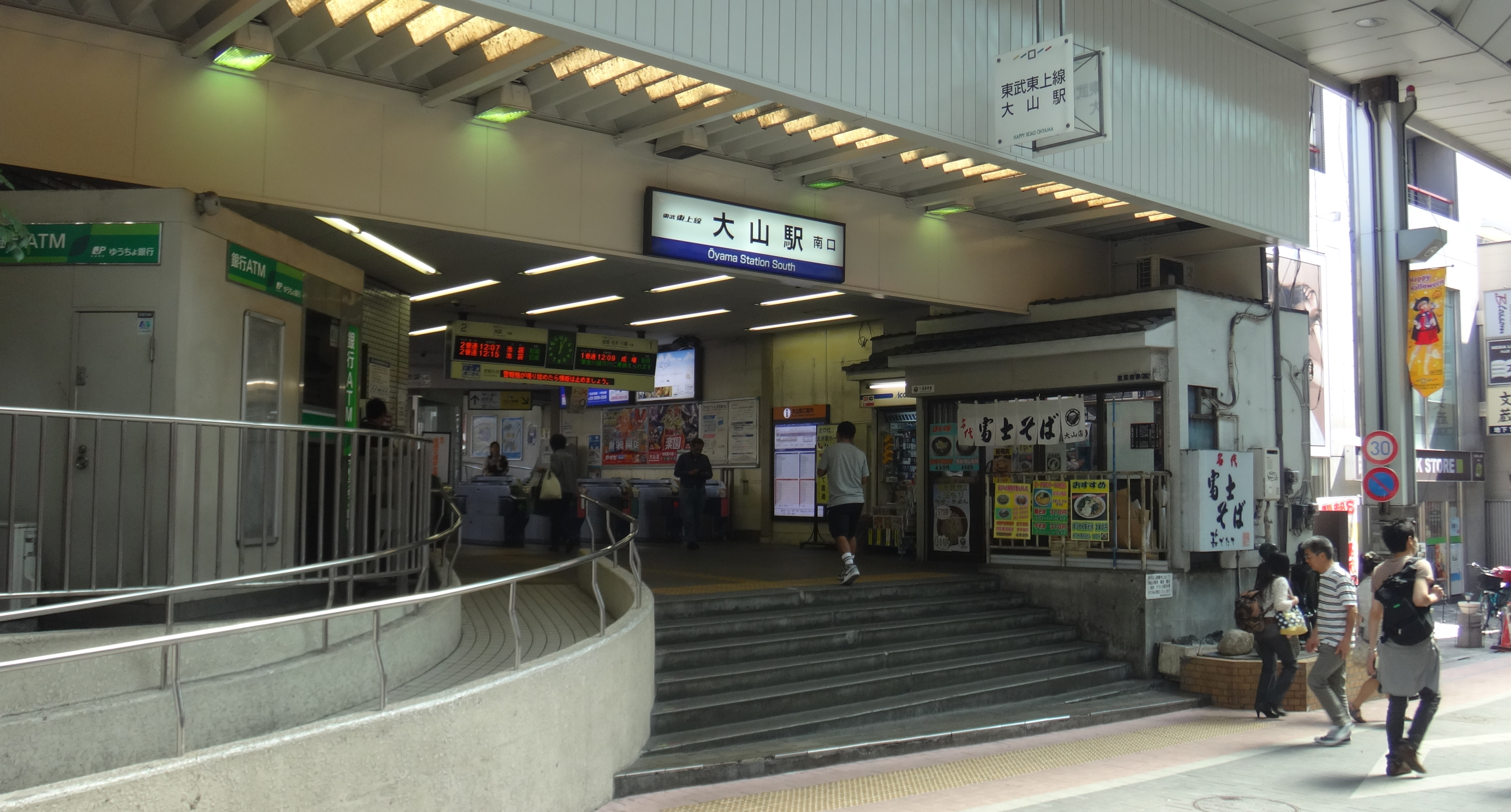
The south entrance in September 2015

== History ==
The station opened on 25 August 1931.

From 17 March 2012, station numbering was introduced on the Tobu Tojo Line, with Ōyama Station becoming "TJ-04".

=== Future plans ===
On 28 July 2022, a grade separation project will result in the facilities being transitioned to a new elevated station structure. The project, which aims to elevate 1.6 km (0.99 mi) of the Tobu Tojo Line, is expected to cost ¥42.8 billion (2021) (equivalent to ¥46.54 billion or US$307.49 million in 2024) and is expected to be completed by 2030. This will also result in the elimination of eight level crossings.

== Passenger statistics ==
In fiscal 2010, the station was used by an average of 46,727 passengers daily.

== Surrounding area ==
- Itabashi-kuyakushomae Station ( Toei Mita Line, 10 minutes' walk)

== See also ==
- List of railway stations in Japan
