= Tokyo College of Transport Studies =

Junior college in Tokyo, Japan

Coordinates: 35°44′27.1″N 139°42′33.7″E

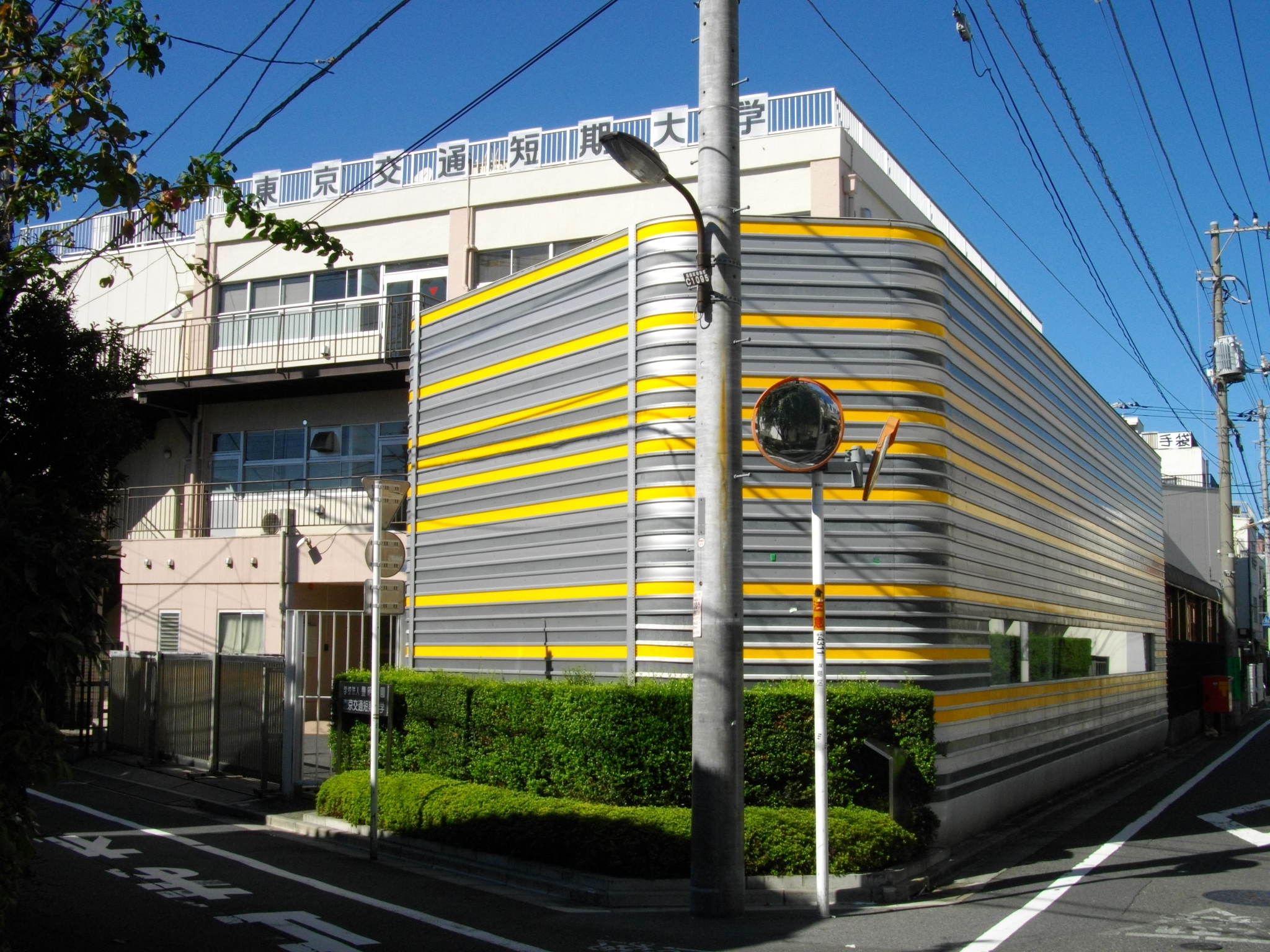
Tokyo College of Transport Studies

Tokyo College of Transport Studies (東京交通短期大学, Tōkyō kōtsū tanki daigaku) is a private junior college in Toshima, Tokyo, Japan. It was established in April 1952.
