= Kami-Itabashi Station =

Railway station in Tokyo, Japan

Coordinates: 35.7634°N 139.6766°E

TJ07 Kami-Itabashi Station 上板橋駅
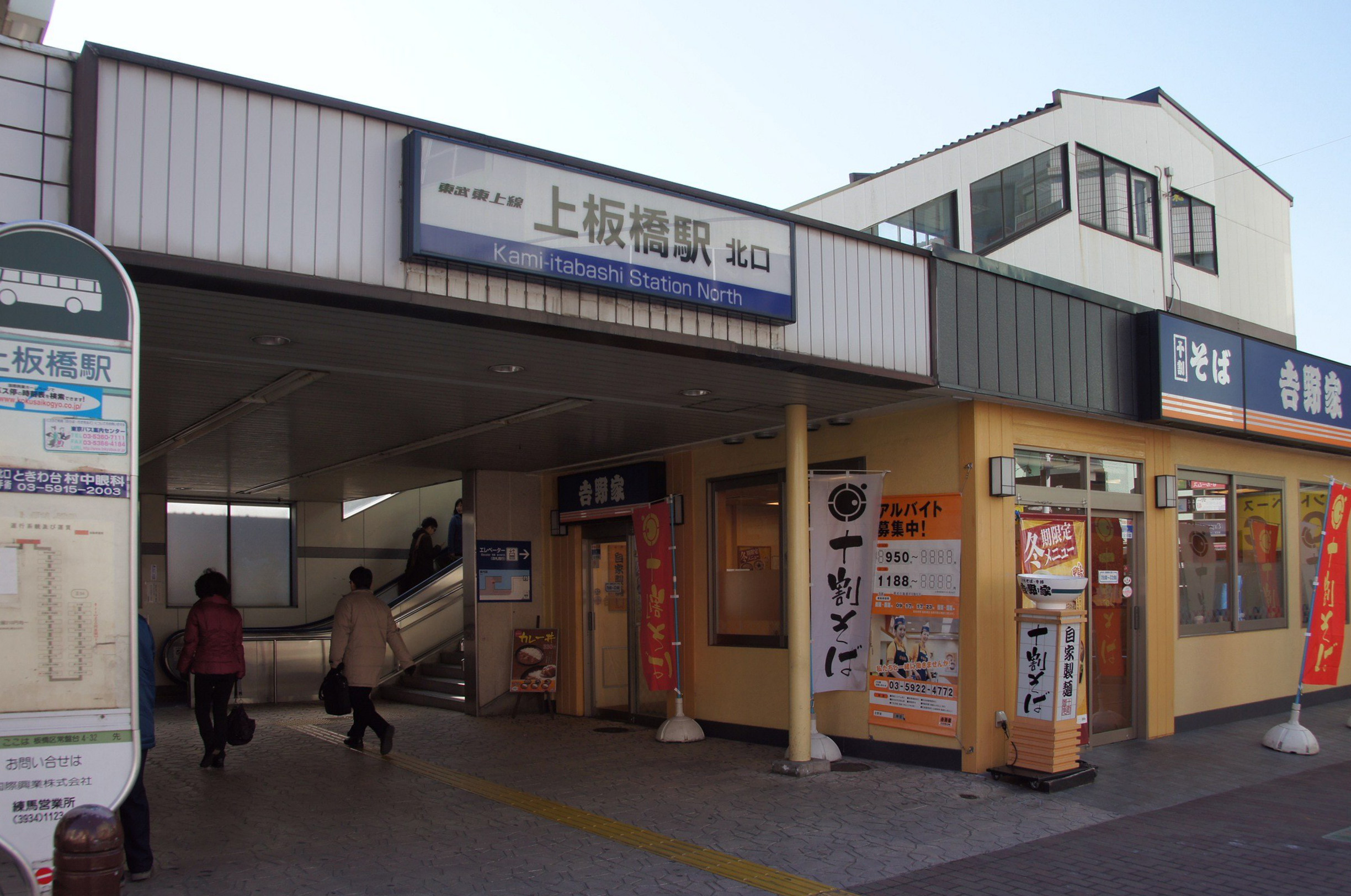
- The north entrance in February 2012

General information
- Location: 2-36-7 Kami-Itabashi, Itabashi-ku, Tokyo 174-0076; Japan
- Operator: Tobu Railway
- Line: Tobu Tojo Line
- Distance: 6.0 km from Ikebukuro
- Platforms: 2 island platforms
- Tracks: 4
- Connections: Bus stop

Other information
- Station code: TJ-07
- Website: www.tobu.co.jp/station/info/7206.html

History
- Opened: 17 June 1914; 112 years ago

Passengers
- FY2010: 48,882 daily

Services
Preceding station	Tobu Railway	Following station
Narimasu TJ10 towards Yorii	Tojo Line Semi Express	Ikebukuro TJ01 Terminus
Tōbu-Nerima TJ08 towards Yorii	Tojo Line Local	Tokiwadai TJ06 towards Ikebukuro
Location
- Location within Japan

Kami-Itabashi Station (上板橋駅, Kami-itabashi-eki) is a railway station on the Tobu Tojo Line in Itabashi, Tokyo, Japan, operated by the private railway operator Tobu Railway.

== Lines ==
Kami-Itabashi Station is served by the Tobu Tojo Line from Ikebukuro in Tokyo. Located between Tokiwadai and Tōbu-Nerima, it is 6.0 km from the Tokyo terminus at Ikebukuro Station. "Local" (all-stations) and Semi Express services stop at this station, with eight trains per hour in each direction during the daytime.

== Station layout ==
The station consists of two island platforms serving four tracks. Platforms 2 and 4 are generally used to allow non-stop trains to pass stopping trains.

=== Platforms ===
1/2	Tōbu Tōjō Line	for Narimasu and Shiki
3/4	Tōbu Tōjō Line	for Ōyama and Ikebukuro

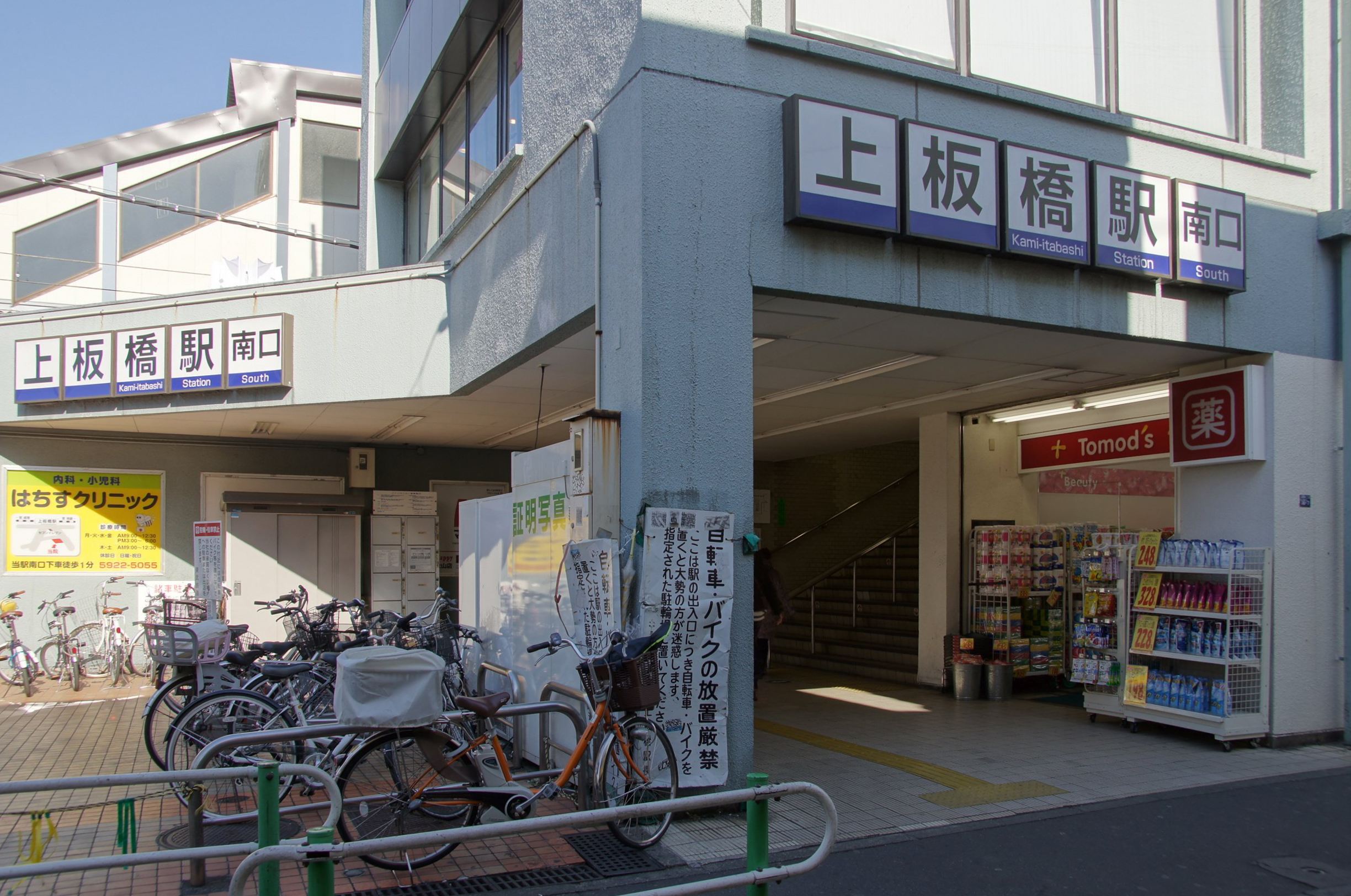
The south entrance in February 2012

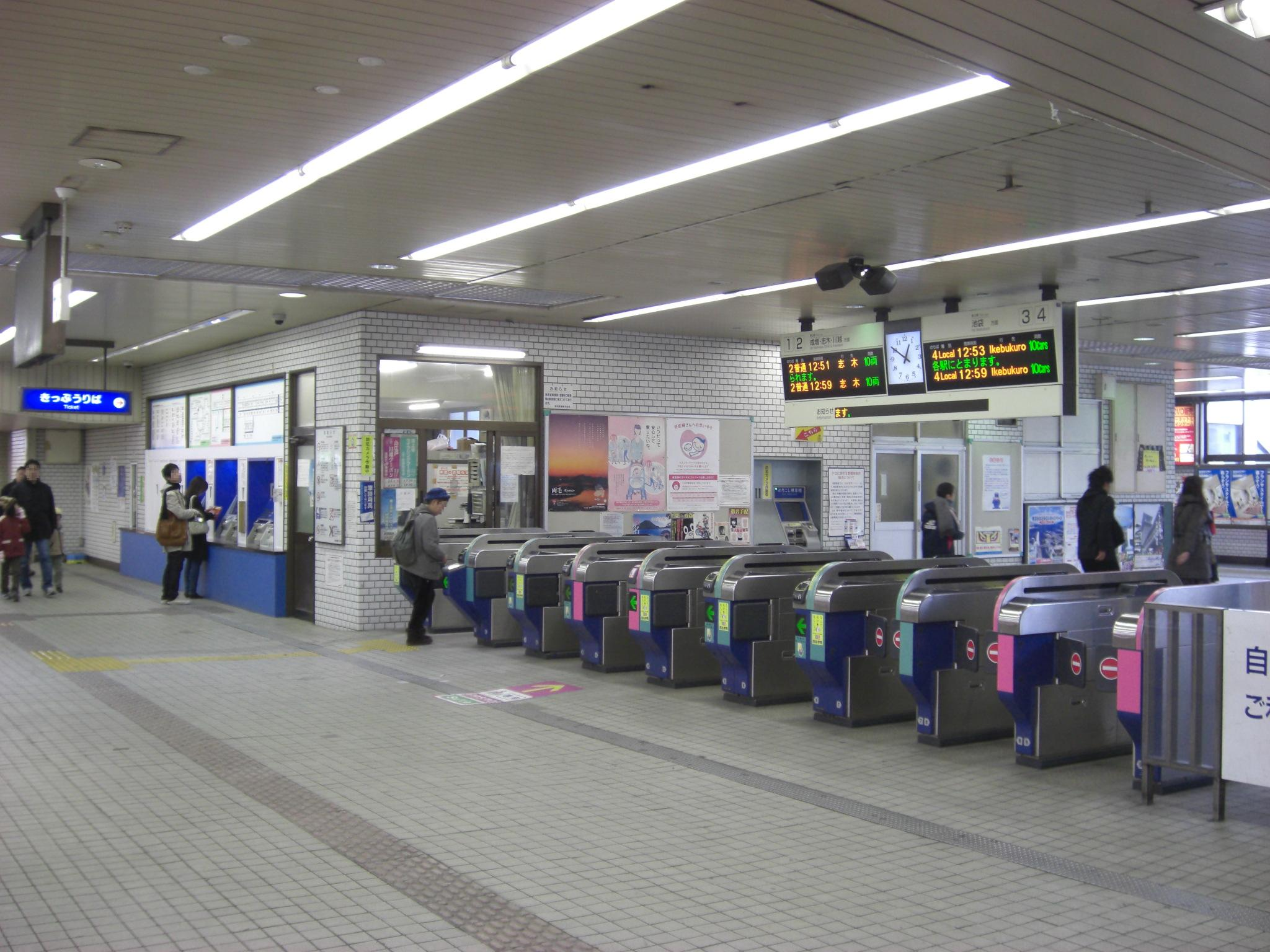
The ticket barriers in February 2009

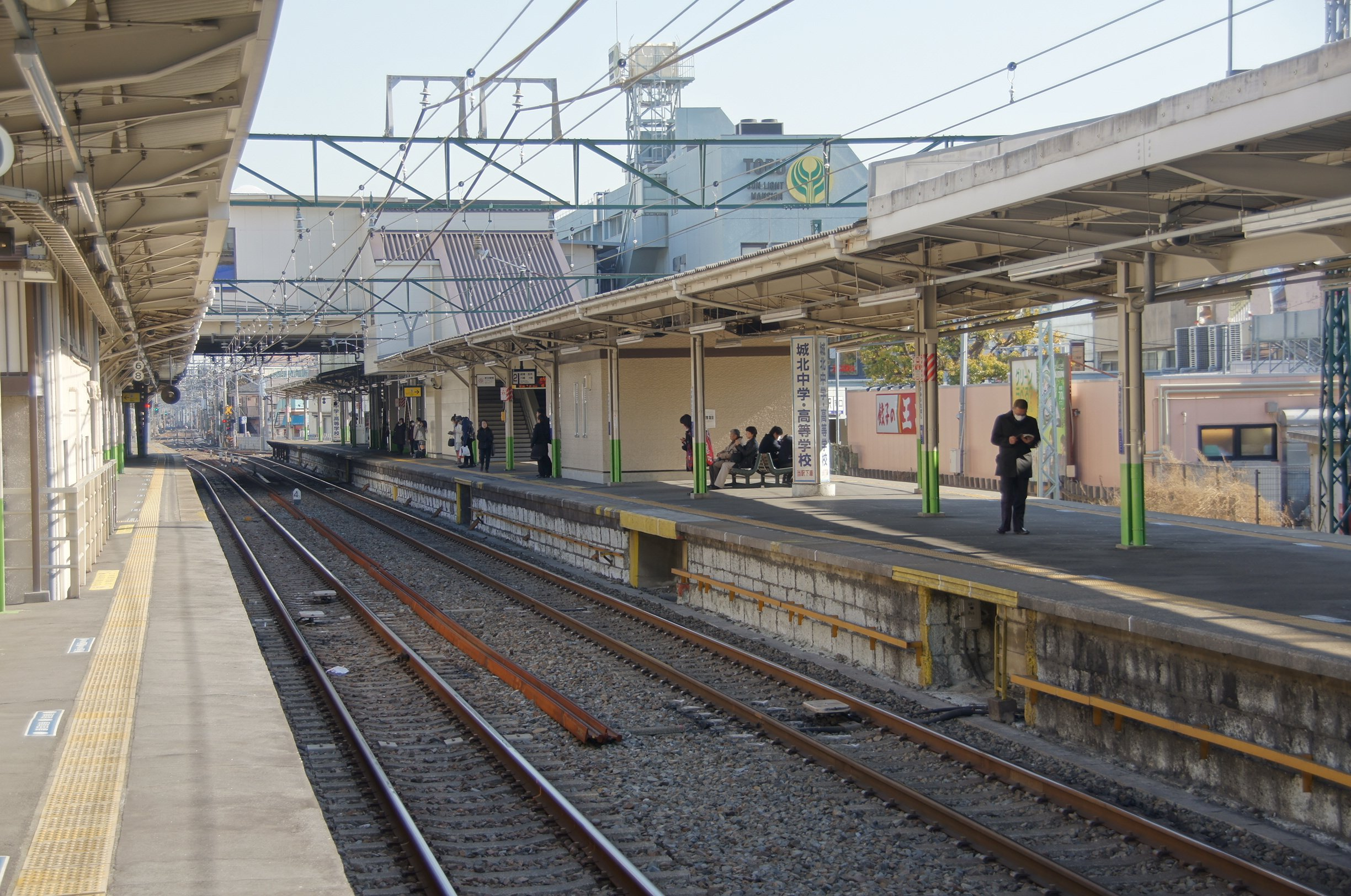
The platforms in February 2012

== History ==
The station opened on 17 June 1914.

From 17 March 2012, station numbering was introduced on the Tobu Tojo Line, with Kami-Itabashi Station becoming "TJ-07".

From March 2023, Kami-Itabashi Station became a Semi Express stop following the abolishment of the Rapid (快速, Kaisoku) service and reorganization of the Tōbu Tōjō Line services.

== Passenger statistics ==
In fiscal 2010, the station was used by an average of 48,882 passengers daily.

== Surrounding area ==
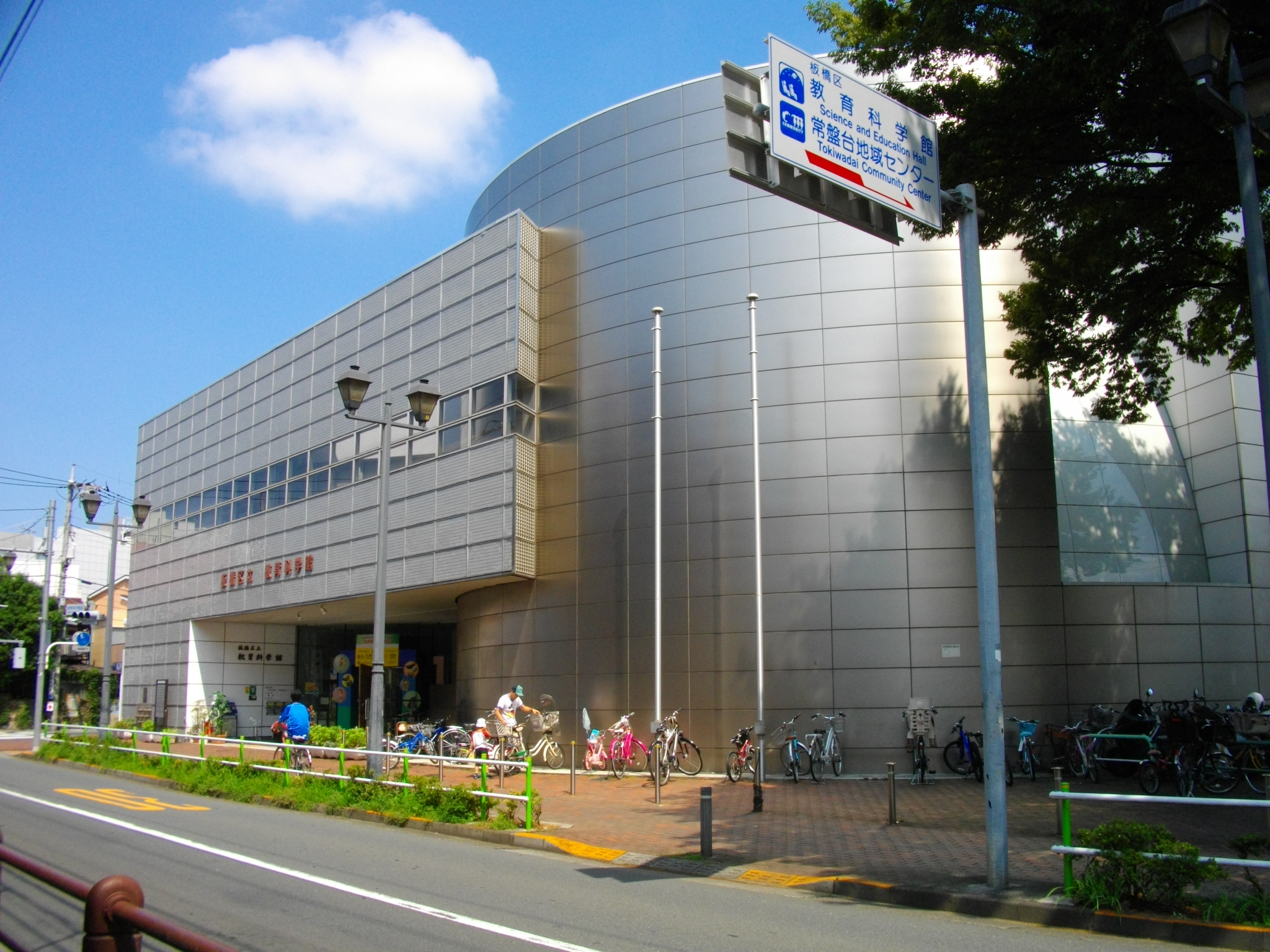
Itabashi Science and Education Hall in August 2011

- Itabashi Science and Education Hall
- Johoku-Chuo Park
- Itabashi Peace Park
- Tokyo Ōyama High School

== See also ==
- List of railway stations in Japan
