= Mizuhodai Station =

Railway station in Fujimi, Saitama Prefecture, Japan

TJ16 Mizuhodai Station みずほ台駅
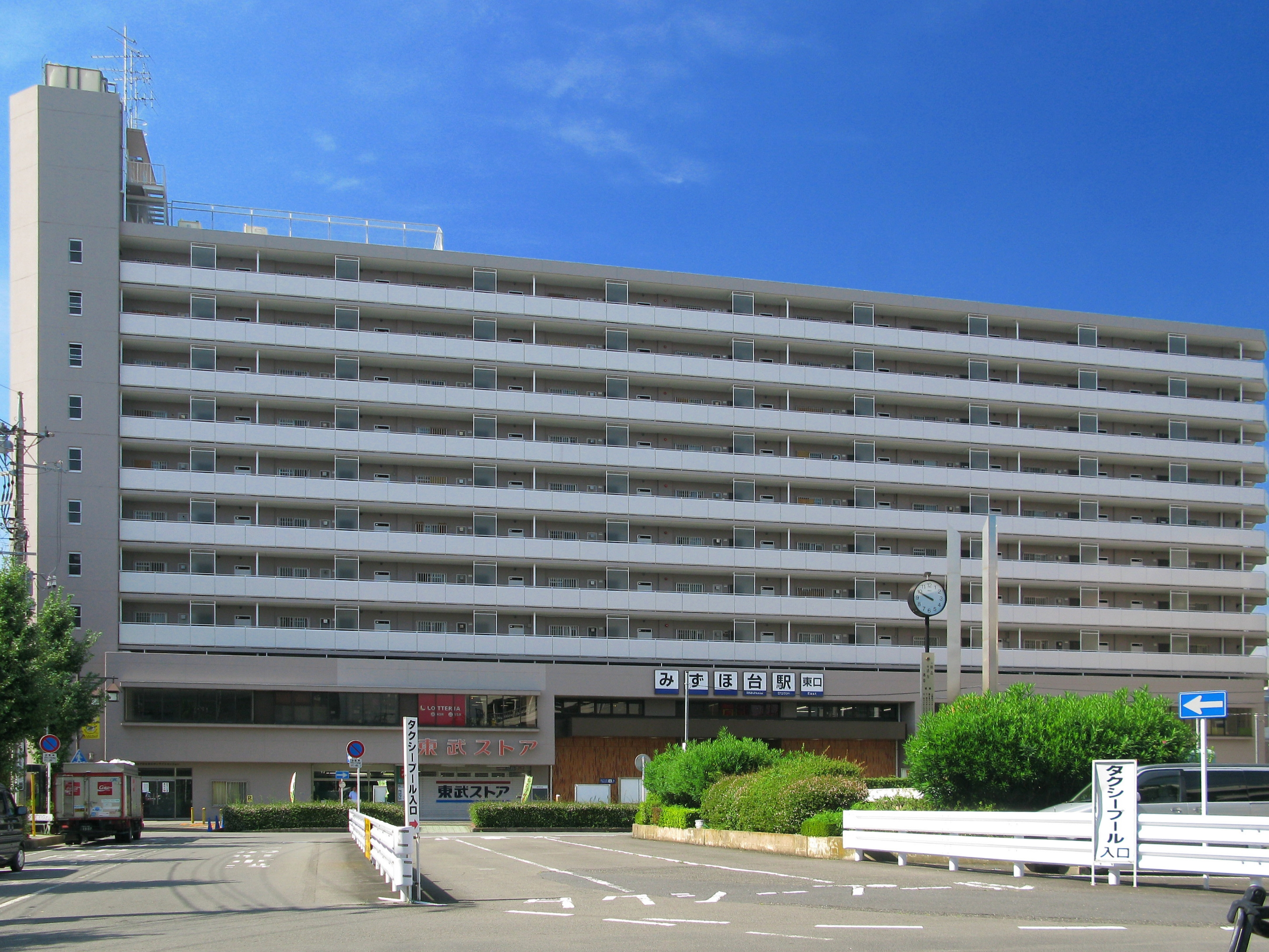
- The east side of the station in September 2012

General information
- Location: 2-29-1 Mizuhodai, Fujimi-shi, Saitama-ken 354-0015; Japan
- Coordinates: 35.8382°N 139.5509°E
- Operator: Tōbu Railway
- Line: Tōbu Tōjō Line
- Distance: 20.6 km from Ikebukuro
- Platforms: 1 island platform
- Tracks: 2
- Connections: Bus terminal

Other information
- Station code: TJ-16
- Website: Official website

History
- Opened: 21 October 1977

Passengers
- FY2019: 41,146 daily

Services
Preceding station	Tobu Railway	Following station
Tsuruse TJ17 towards Yorii	Tojo Line Semi Express Local	Yanasegawa TJ15 towards Ikebukuro
Location
- Location within Saitama Prefecture Location within Japan

Mizuhodai Station (みずほ台駅, Mizuhodai-eki) is a passenger railway station located in the city of Fujimi, Saitama, Japan, operated by the private railway operator Tōbu Railway.

== Lines ==
Mizuhodai station is served by the Tōbu Tōjō Line from Ikebukuro in Tokyo, with some services inter-running via the Tokyo Metro Yurakucho Line to Shin-Kiba and the Tokyo Metro Fukutoshin Line to Shibuya and onward via the Tokyu Toyoko Line and Minato Mirai Line to Motomachi-Chukagai. Located between Yanasegawa and Tsuruse stations, it is 20.6 km from the Ikebukuro terminus. Only Semi Express and Local services stop at this station.

== Station layout ==
The station consists of a single island platform serving two tracks, with an elevated station building located above the platform.

=== Platforms ===
1	■ Tōbu Tōjō Line	for Fujimino, Kawagoe, Shinrinkōen, Ogawamachi, and Yorii
2	■ Tōbu Tōjō Line	for Shiki, Wakōshi, Narimasu, and Ikebukuro; Tokyo Metro Yurakucho Line for Shin-Kiba; Tokyo Metro Fukutoshin Line for Shibuya; Tōkyū Tōyoko Line for Hiyoshi and Yokohama; Tōkyū Shin-Yokohama Line for Shin-Yokohama via Sōtetsu Shin-Yokohama Line for Shōnandai; Minatomirai Line for Motomachi-Chukagai

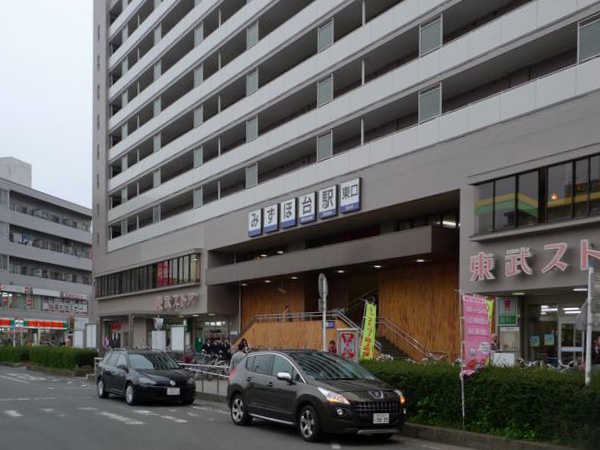
The east entrance in April 2012

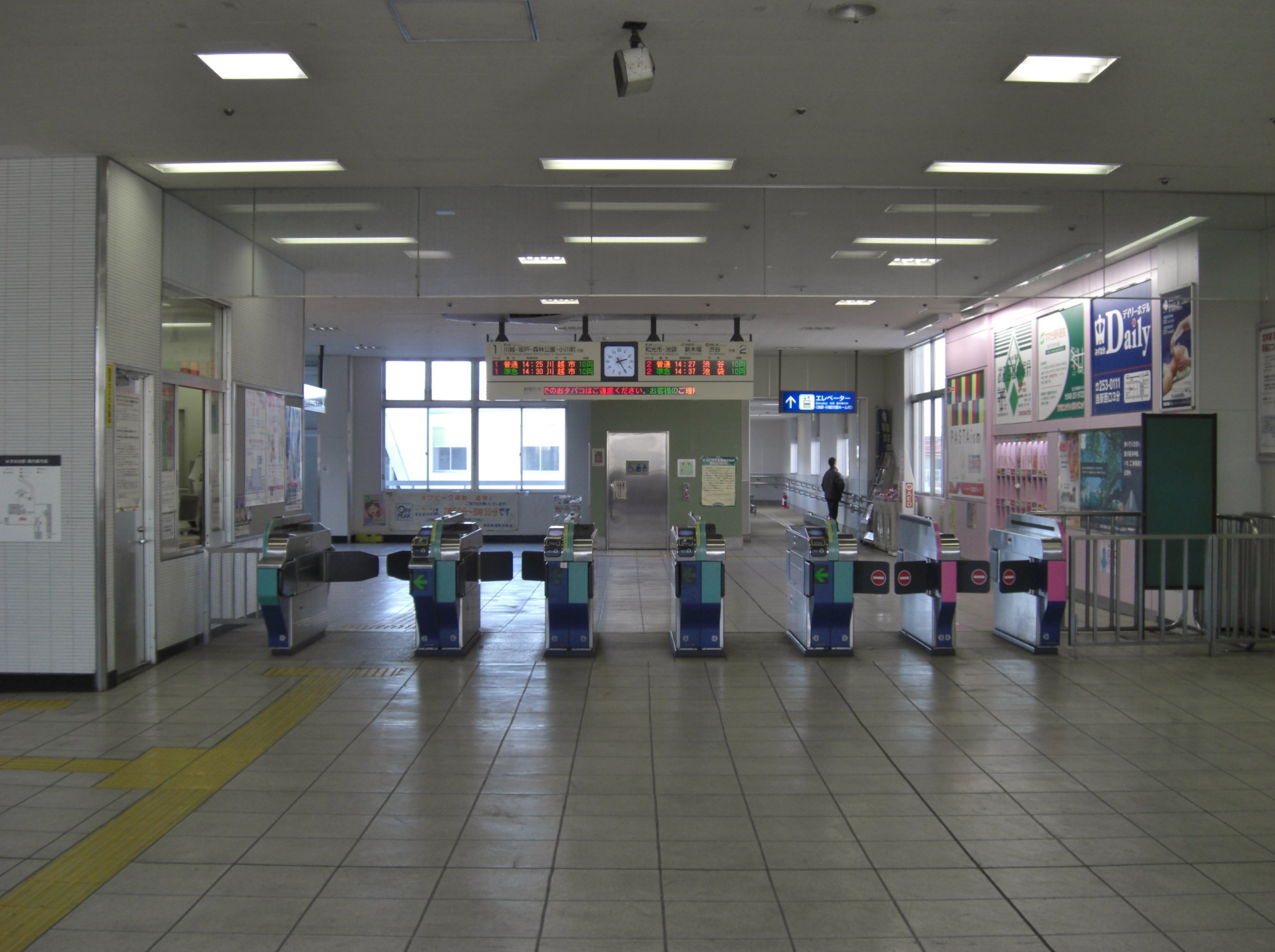
The ticket barriers in February 2009

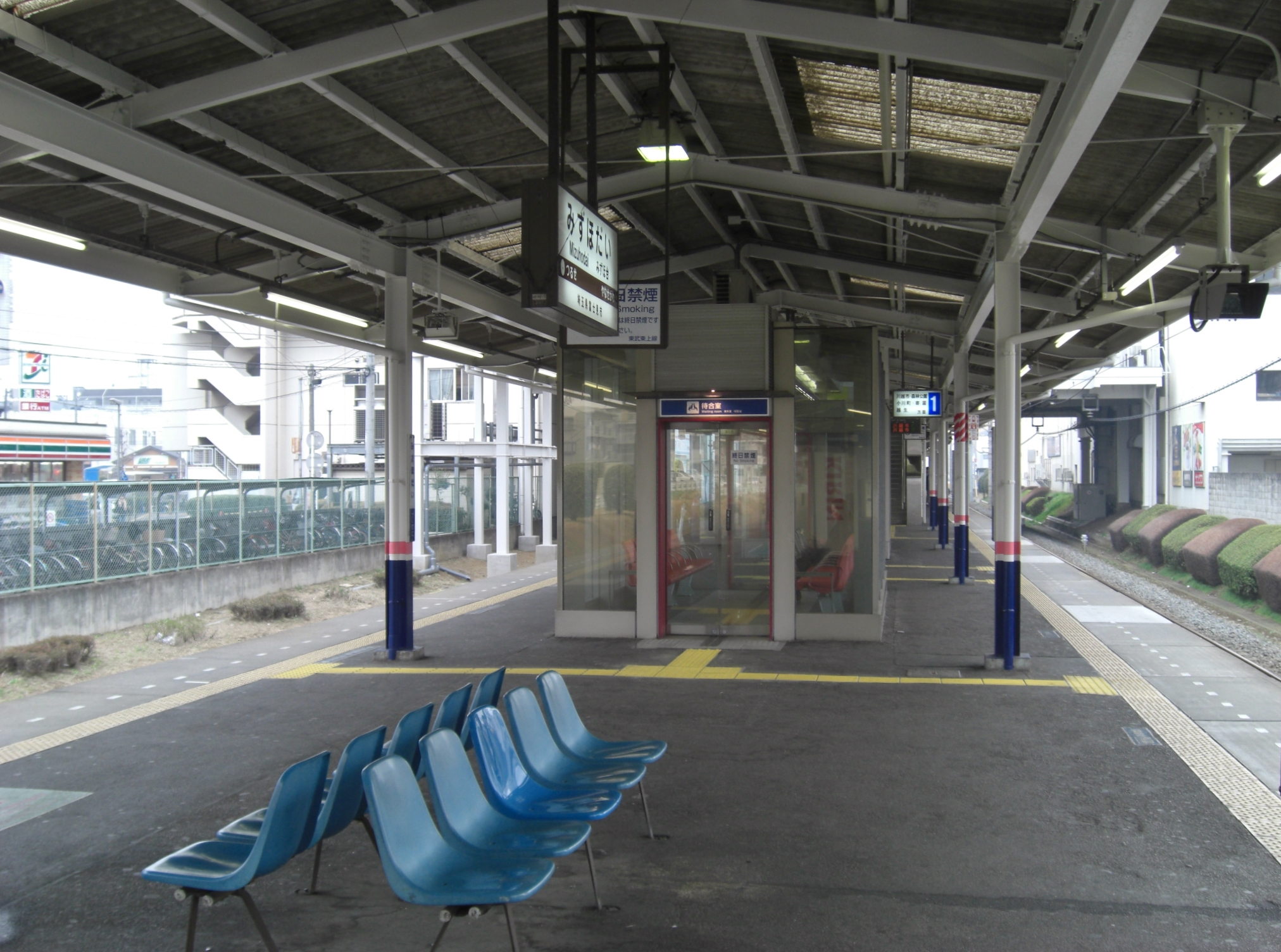
The platforms and passenger waiting room in March 2008

== History ==
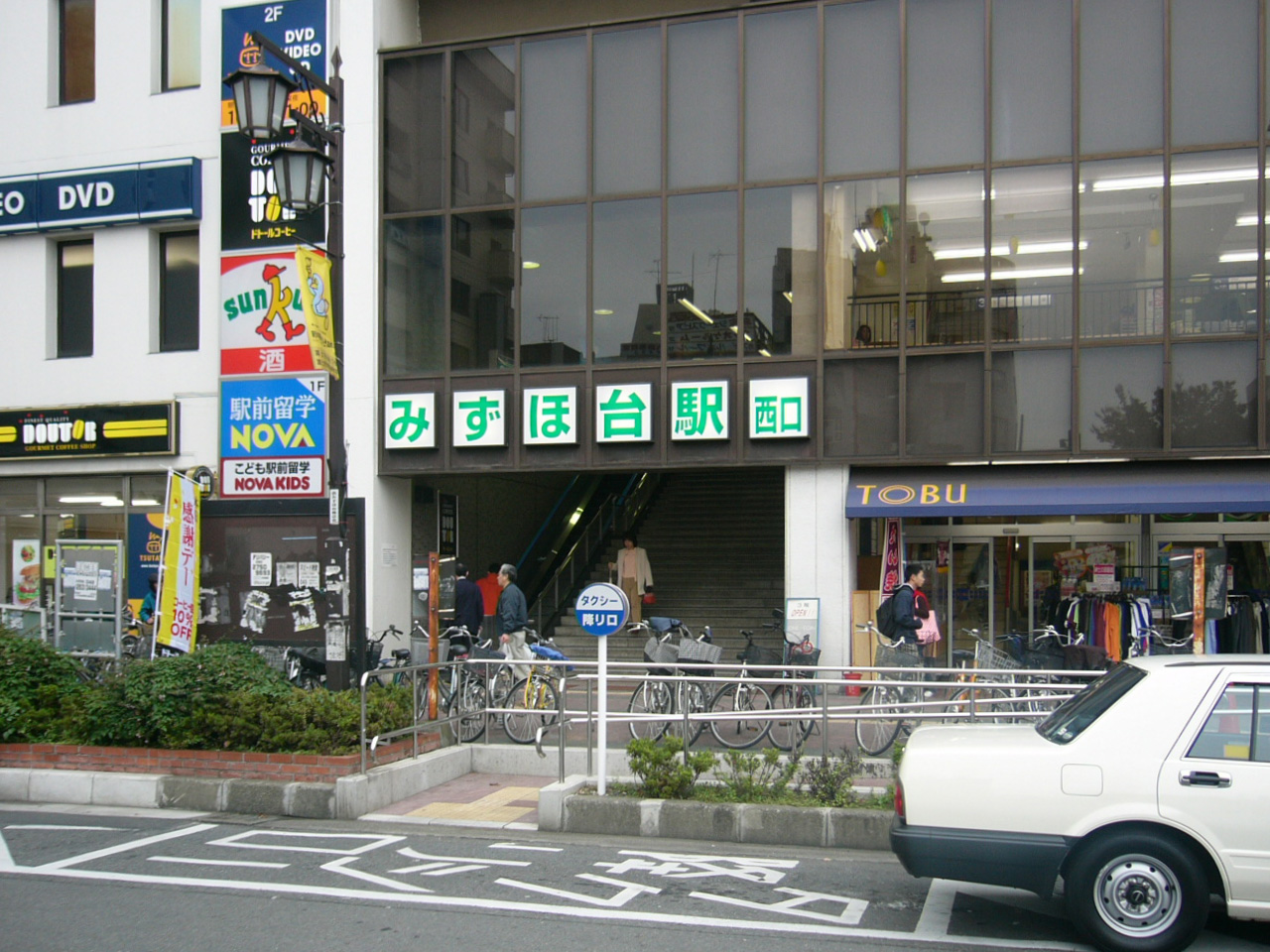
The west entrance in November 2004

The station opened on 21 October 1977.

Through-running to and from Shibuya via the Tokyo Metro Fukutoshin Line commenced on 14 June 2008.

From 17 March 2012, station numbering was introduced on the Tobu Tojo Line, with Mizuhodai Station becoming "TJ-16".

Through-running to and from Yokohama and Motomachi-Chukagai via the Tokyu Toyoko Line and Minatomirai Line commenced on 16 March 2013.

Through service via the Tōkyū Shin-yokohama Line, Sōtetsu Shin-yokohama Line, Sōtetsu Main Line, and Sōtetsu Izumino Line to Shin-Yokohama and Shōnandai commenced on 18 March 2023.

== Passenger statistics ==
In fiscal 2019, the station was used by an average of 41,146 passengers daily.

== See also ==
- List of railway stations in Japan
