= Kami-Fukuoka Station =

Railway station in Fujimino, Saitama Prefecture, Japan

TJ19 Kami-Fukuoka Station 上福岡駅
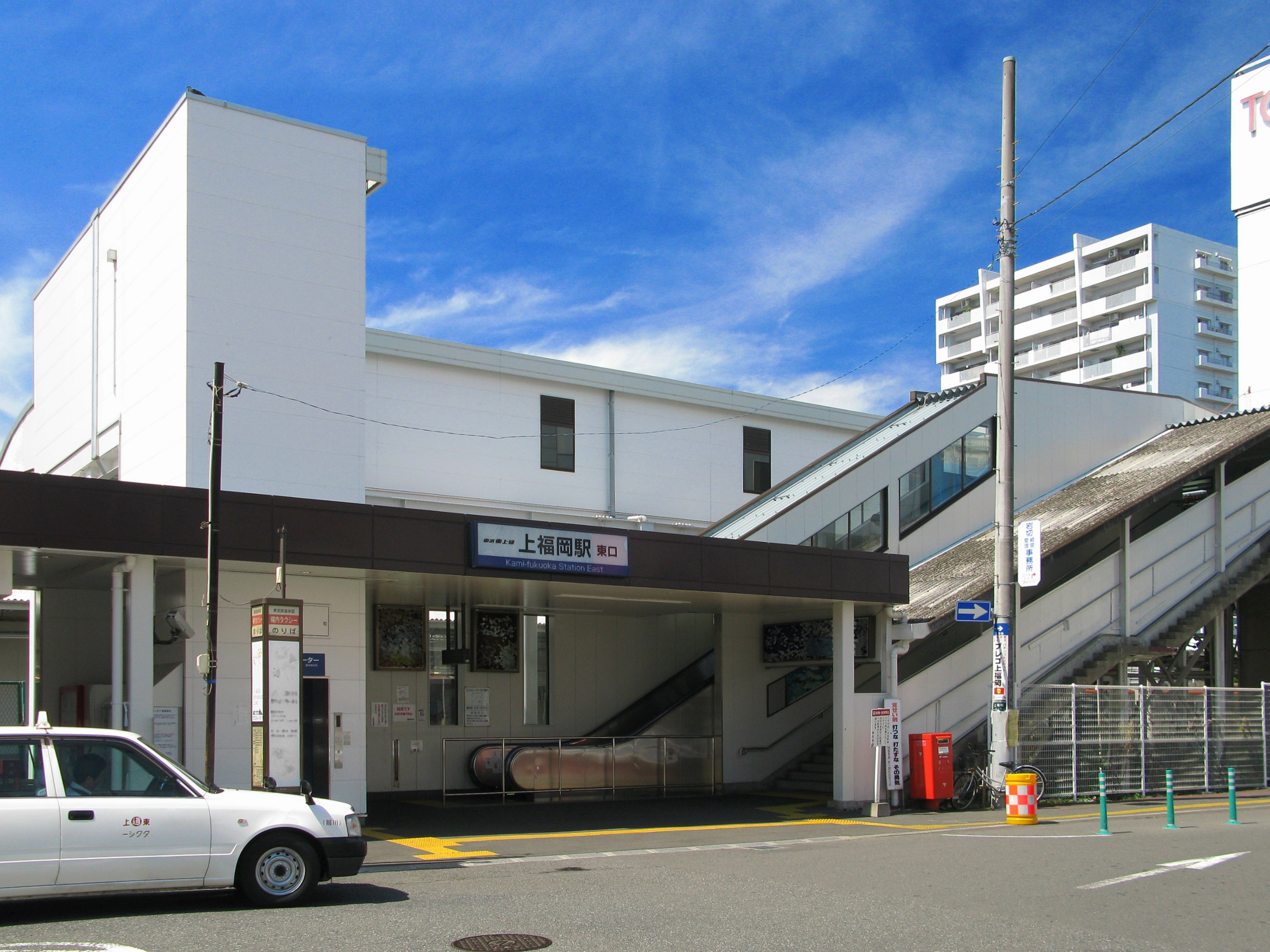
- The east entrance in September 2012

General information
- Location: 1-1-1 Kamifukuoka, Fujimino-shi, Saitama-ken 356–0004; Japan
- Coordinates: 35.8739°N 139.5116°E
- Operator: Tōbu Railway
- Line: Tōbu Tōjō Line
- Distance: 25.9 km from Ikebukuro
- Platforms: 1 island platform
- Tracks: 2

Other information
- Station code: TJ-19
- Website: Official website

History
- Opened: 1 May 1914

Passengers
- FY2019: 56,428 daily

Services
Preceding station	Tobu Railway	Following station
Shingashi TJ20 towards Yorii	Tojo Line Semi Express Local	Fujimino TJ18 towards Ikebukuro
Location
- Location within Saitama Prefecture Location within Japan

Kami-Fukuoka Station (上福岡駅, Kamifukuoka-eki) is a passenger railway station located in the city of Fujimino, Saitama, Japan, operated by the private railway operator Tōbu Railway.

== Lines ==
Kami-Fukuoka Station is served by the Tōbu Tōjō Line from Ikebukuro in Tokyo, with some services inter-running via the Tokyo Metro Yurakucho Line to Shin-Kiba and the Tokyo Metro Fukutoshin Line to Shibuya and onward via the Tokyu Toyoko Line and Minato Mirai Line to Motomachi-Chukagai. Located between Fujimino and Shingashi, it is 25.9 km from the Ikebukuro terminus. Only Semi express and Local services stop at this station.

== Station layout ==
The station consists of a single island platform serving two tracks. The elevated station building is located over the platform with exits on both east and west sides. Lifts were added to either side in 2009 and 2010.

This station has a season ticket sales office.

A storage siding is located to the west (Kawagoe direction) of the station between the up and down tracks, and this is used to stable trains during the daytime off peak.

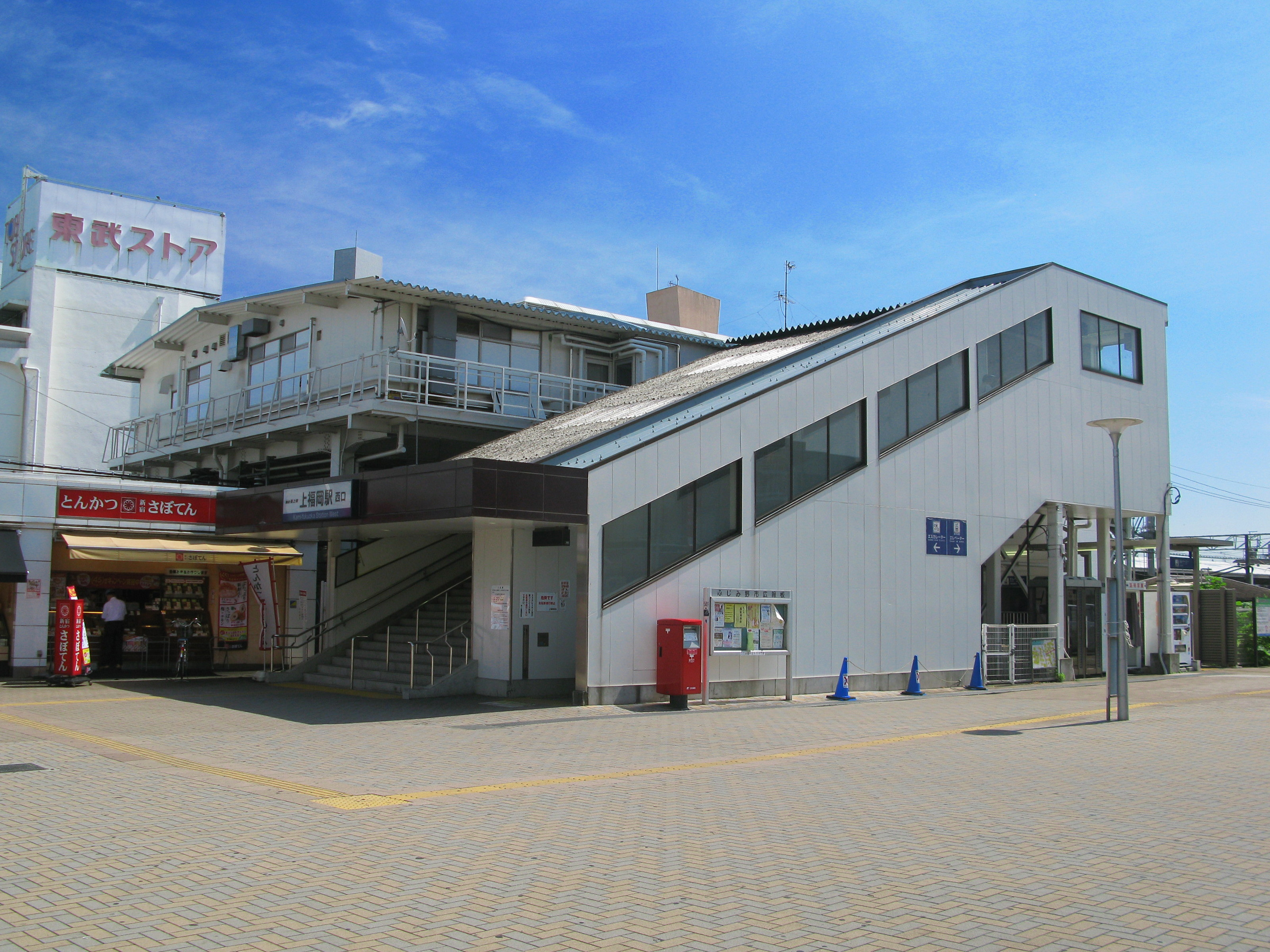
The west entrance in September 2012

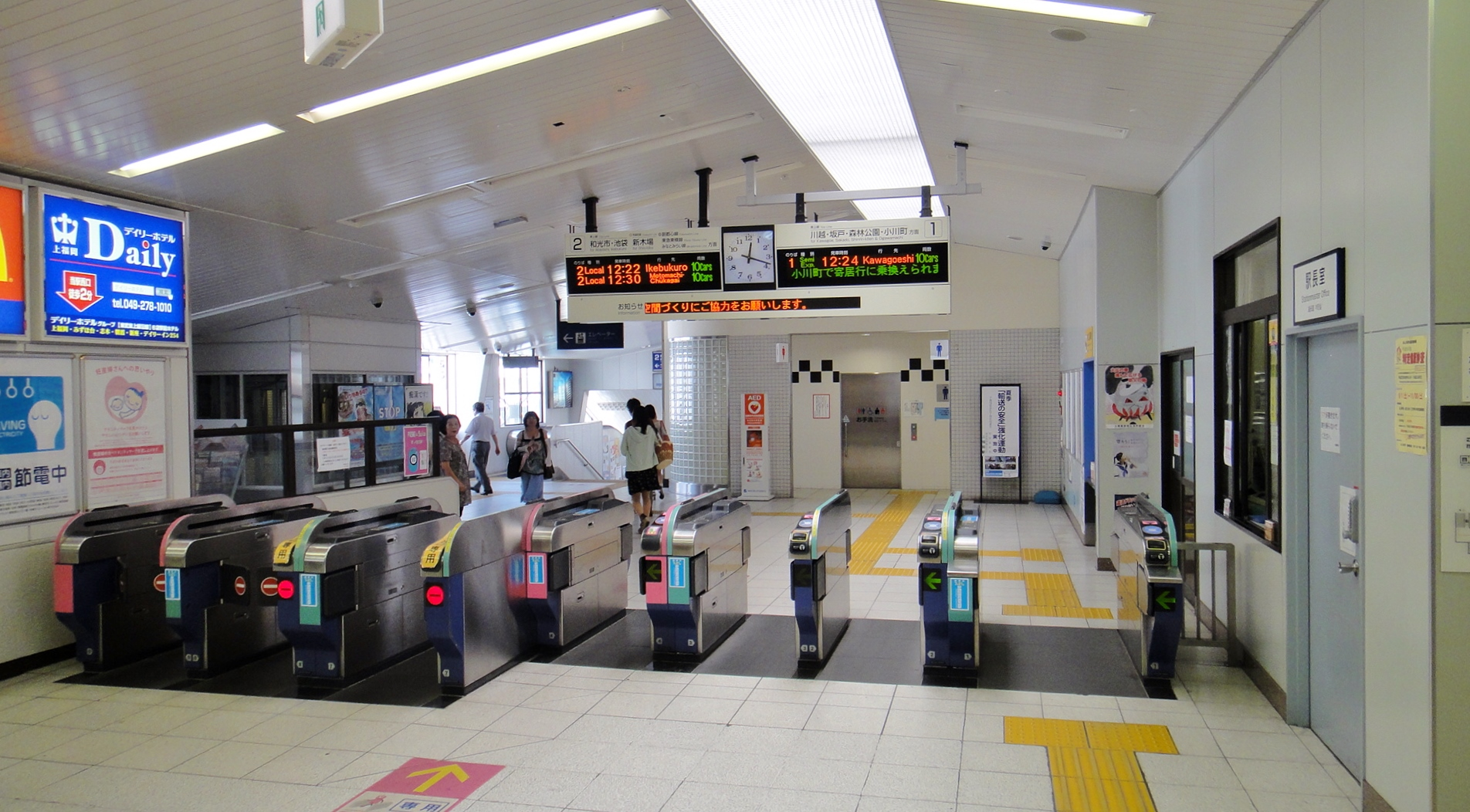
The ticket barriers in July 2013

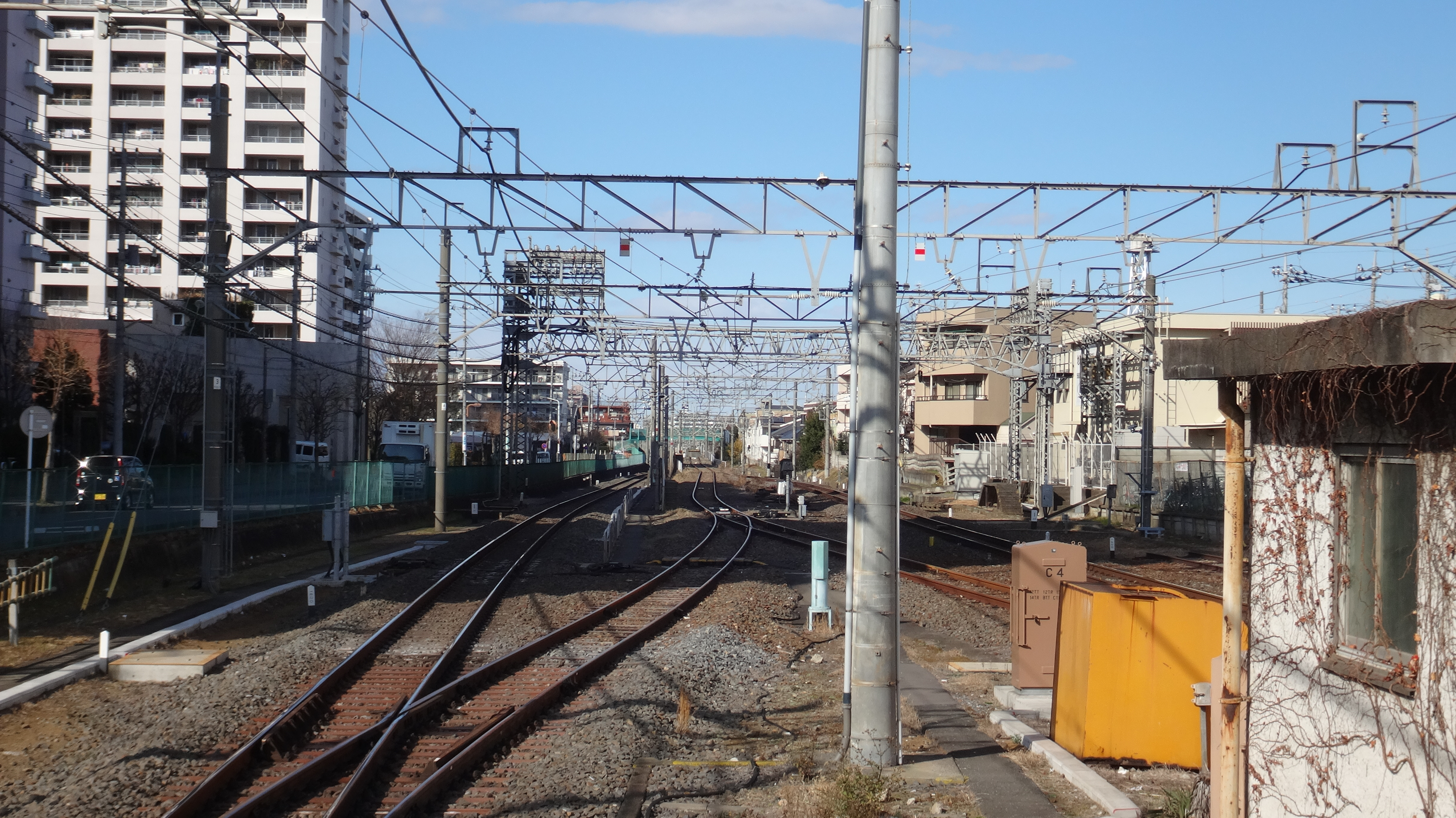
The stabling siding seen from the down end of the platform in January 2016

=== Platforms ===
1	■ Tōbu Tōjō Line	for Kawagoe, Shinrinkōen, Ogawamachi, and Yorii
2	■ Tōbu Tōjō Line	for Fujimino, Wakōshi, Narimasu, and Ikebukuro; Tokyo Metro Yurakucho Line for Shin-Kiba; Tokyo Metro Fukutoshin Line for Shibuya; Tōkyū Tōyoko Line for Hiyoshi and Yokohama; Tōkyū Shin-Yokohama Line for Shin-Yokohama via Sōtetsu Shin-Yokohama Line for Shōnandai; Minatomirai Line for Motomachi-Chukagai

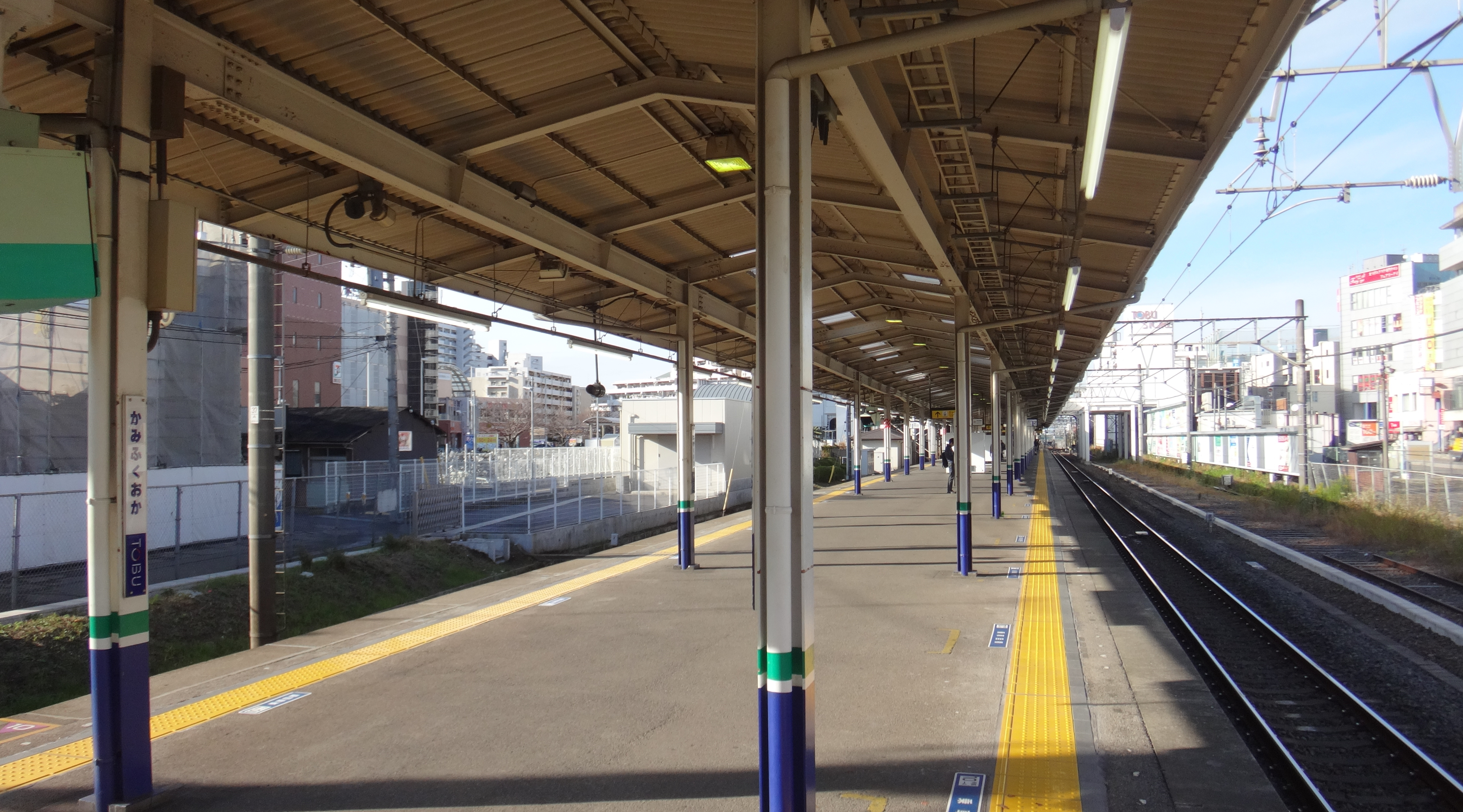
The platform viewed from the up (Ikebukuro) end in December 2015

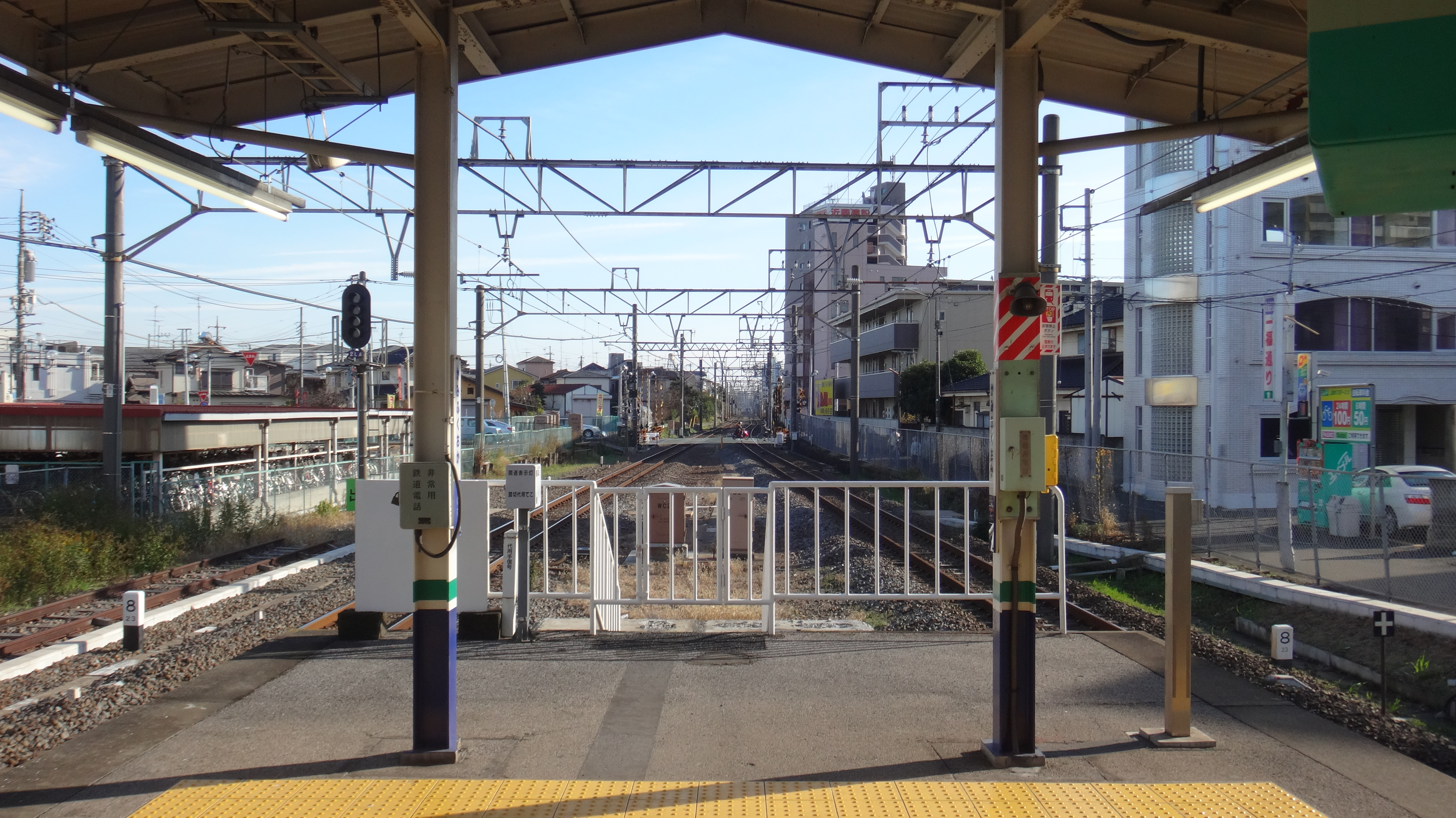
The view from the up (Ikebukuro) end of the platform in December 2015 after the demolishment of the former toilet block

== History ==
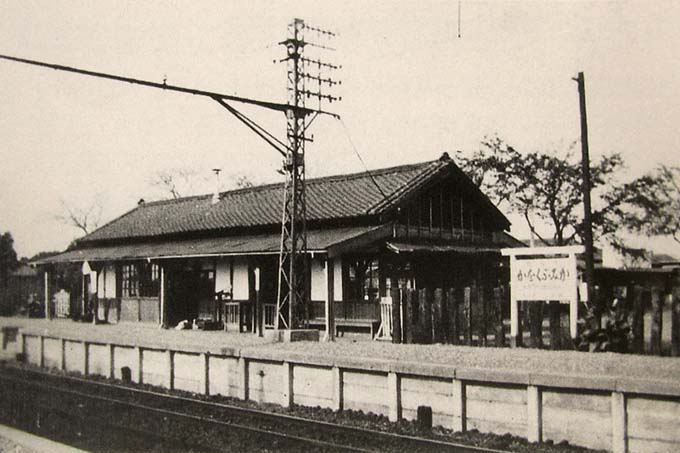
Kami-fukuoka Station in 1936

The station opened on 1 May 1914 coinciding with the opening of the Tōbu Tōjō Line from Ikebukuro.

In September 1967, the platforms were extended to accommodate eight-car trains, and the platforms were again extended in November 1976 to accommodate ten-car trains.

Through-running to and from Shibuya via the Tokyo Metro Fukutoshin Line commenced on 14 June 2008.

From 17 March 2012, station numbering was introduced on the Tōbu Tōjō Line, with Kami-Fukuoka Station becoming "TJ-19".

Through-running to and from Yokohama and Motomachi-Chukagai via the Tokyu Toyoko Line and Minatomirai Line commenced on 16 March 2013.

Through running to and from Shin-Yokohama and Shōnandai via the Tōkyū Shin-yokohama Line, Sōtetsu Shin-yokohama Line, Sōtetsu Main Line, and Sōtetsu Izumino Line commenced on 18 March 2023.

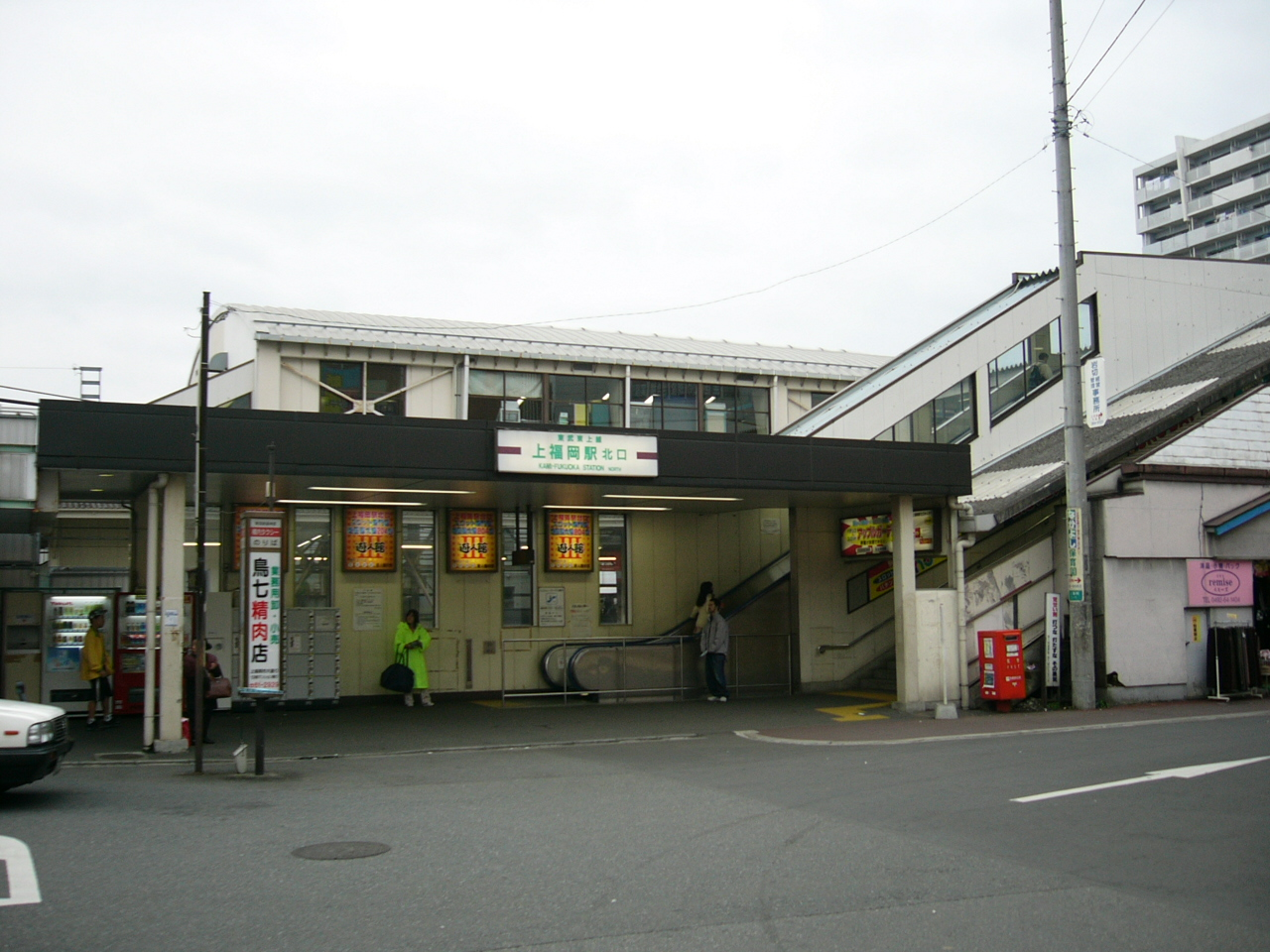
North entrance (now East entrance) before rebuilding, November 2004

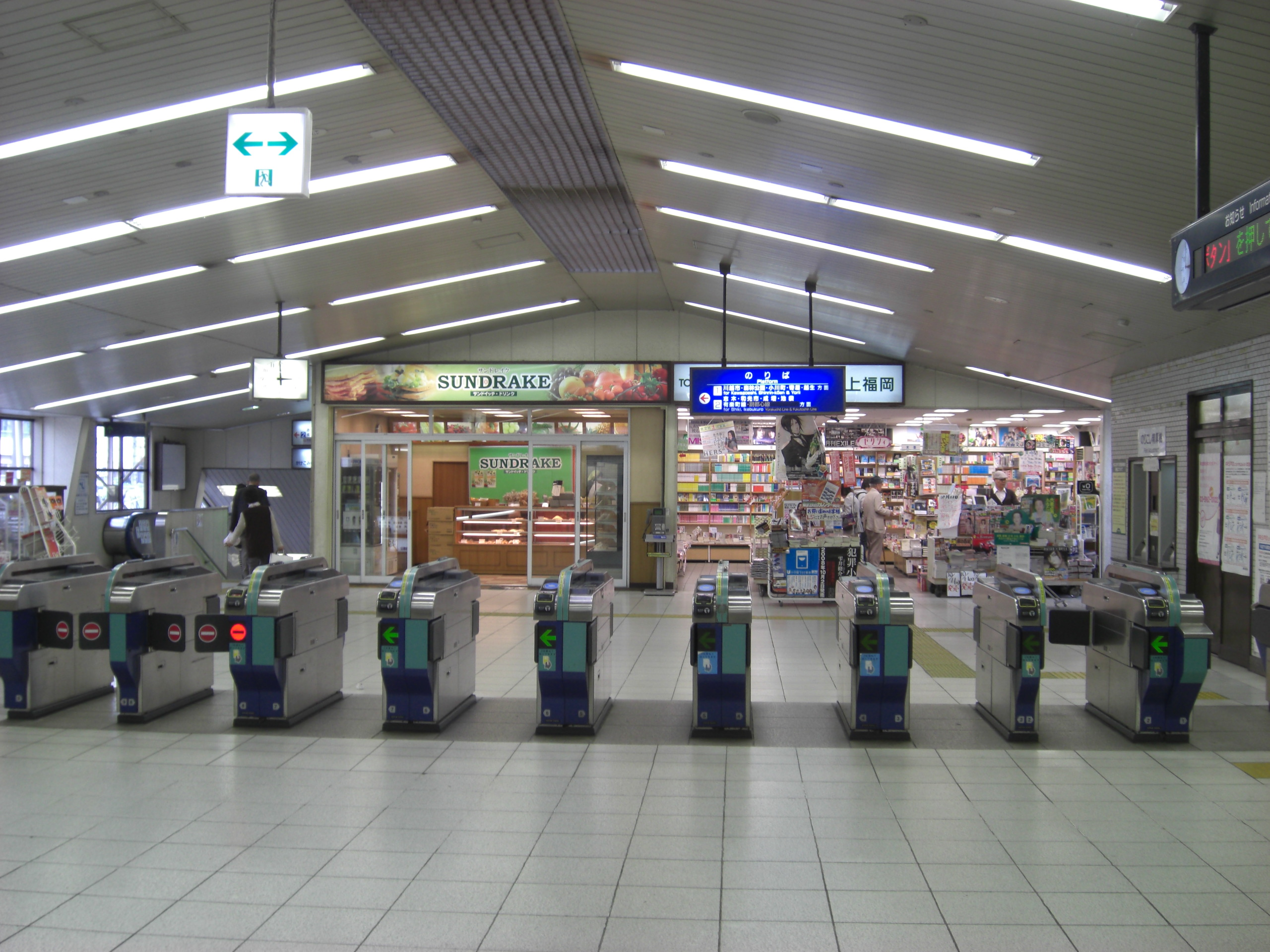
Ticket barriers before rebuilding, October 2008

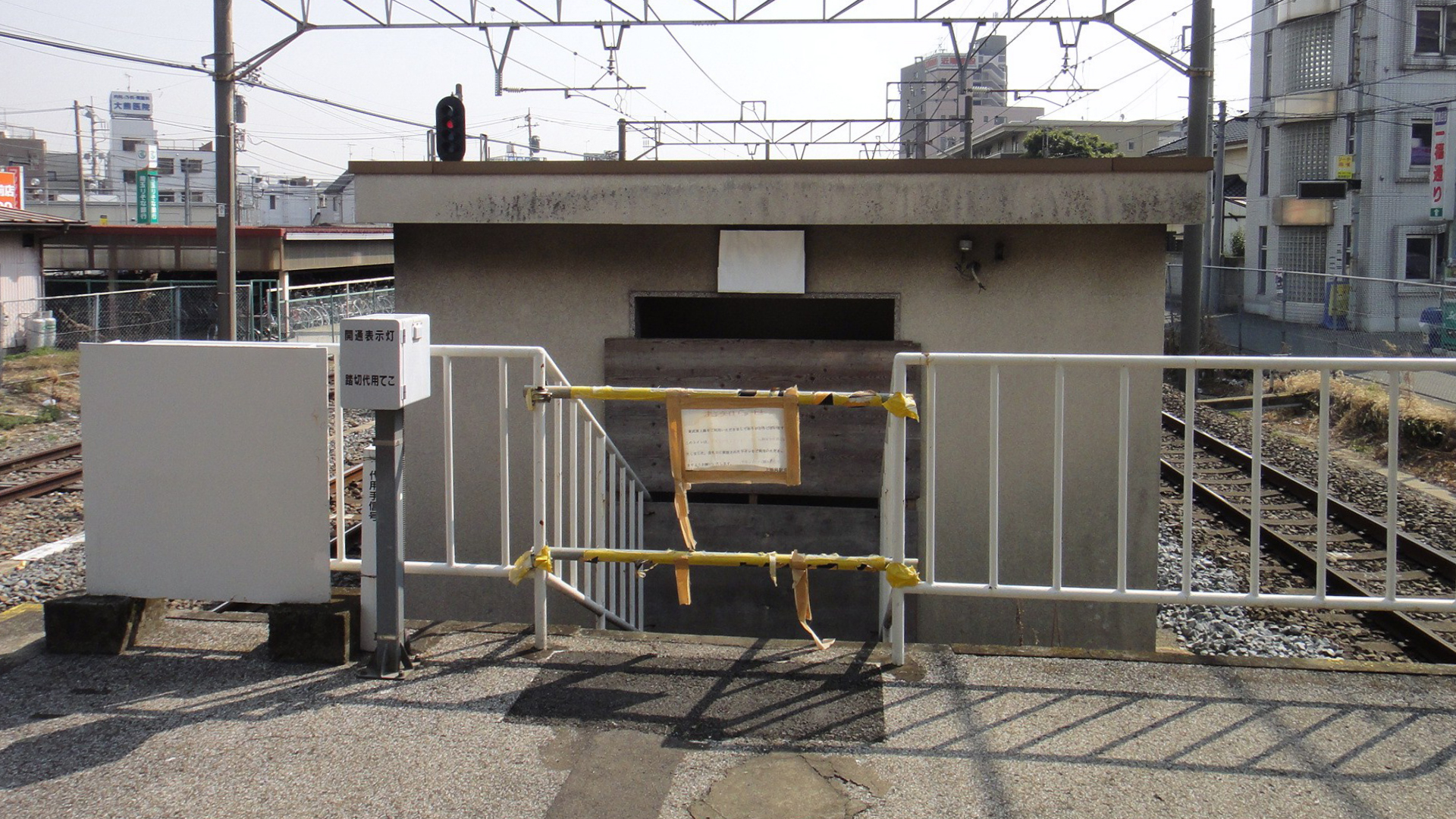
The former toilet block at the Ikebukuro end of the platform, March 2013

== Passenger statistics ==
In fiscal 2019, the station was used by an average of 56,428 passengers daily. Passenger figures for previous years (boarding passengers only) are as shown below.

Fiscal year	Daily average
1950	2,316
1960	8,609
1970	30,421
1980	37,584
1990	46,039
2000	29,490
2010	31,153

== Accidents ==
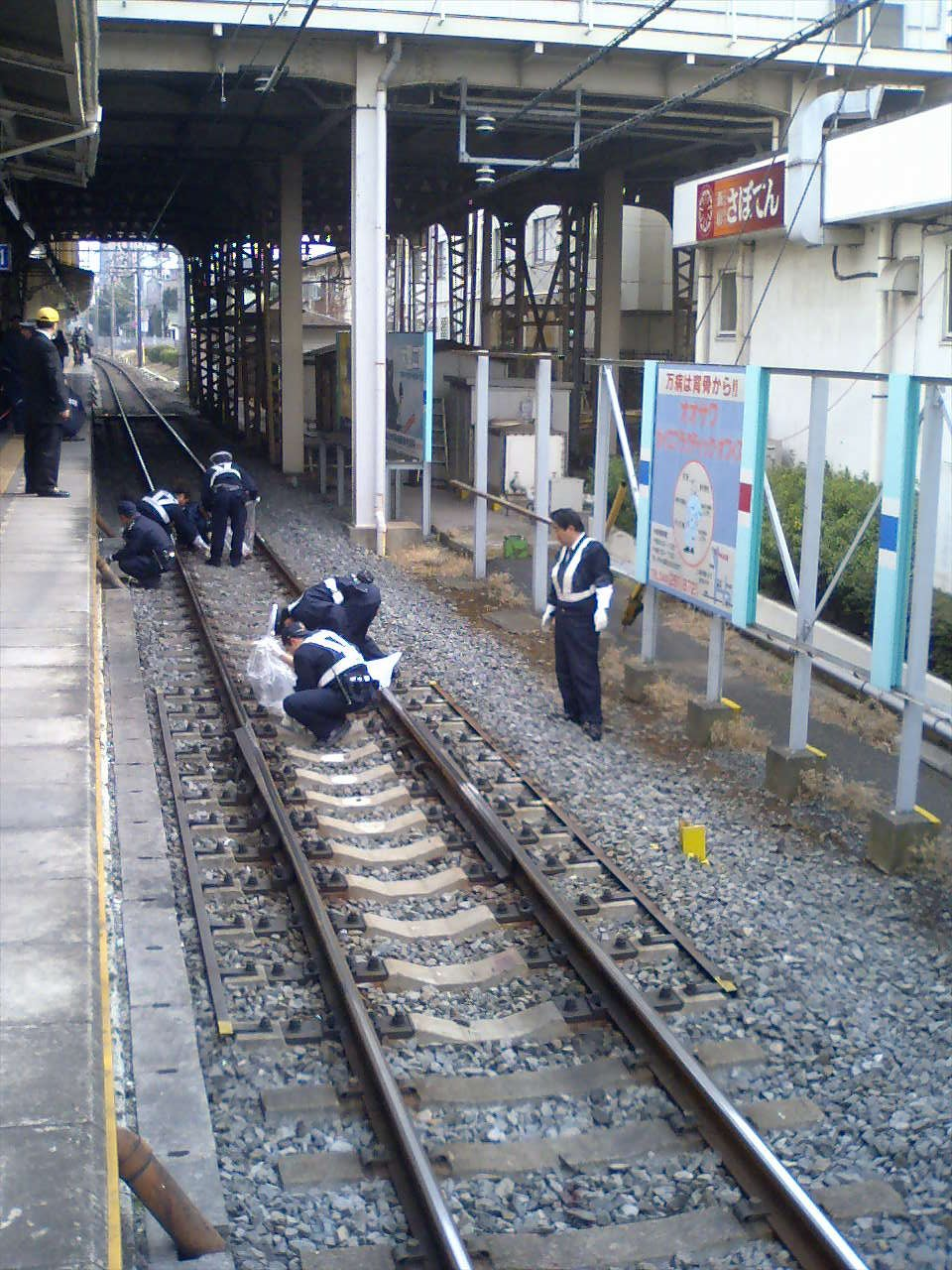
Police officers clearing up remaining debris on the down track following a suicide, 23 January 2006

On 14 January 2003 at 20:38, an unidentified passenger fell from the platform under the influence of alcohol and was killed by a passing train.

On 23 January 2006 at 12:55, a man jumped from the down platform in front of an approaching non-stop train travelling at approximately 90 km/h and was killed instantly.

On 18 October 2006 at 10:09, an unidentified person entered the No. 135 level crossing close to the station and was killed instantly by an approaching train travelling at approximately 85 km/h.

On 11 May 2007 at 11:29, a woman jumped from the platform in front of an approaching non-stop train travelling at approximately 95 km/h and was killed instantly.

On 30 July 2007 at 20:02, a man in his twenties sat down on the track in front of an approaching non-stop train (set 51001) travelling at approximately 80 km/h and was killed instantly.

On 1 November 2007 at 20:29, a 53-year-old woman jumped from the down platform in front of an approaching non-stop train travelling at approximately 90 km/h and was killed instantly.

On 7 July 2008 at 00:47, a 22-year-old woman sat down on the down track close to the No. 135 level crossing near the station and was killed instantly by an approaching train travelling at approximately 80 km/h.

On 4 September 2008 at 10:42, a 28-year-old woman was injured after jumping from the platform 5 metres in front of an approaching train travelling at approximately 40 km/h. The windscreen of the train was damaged.

== Surrounding area ==
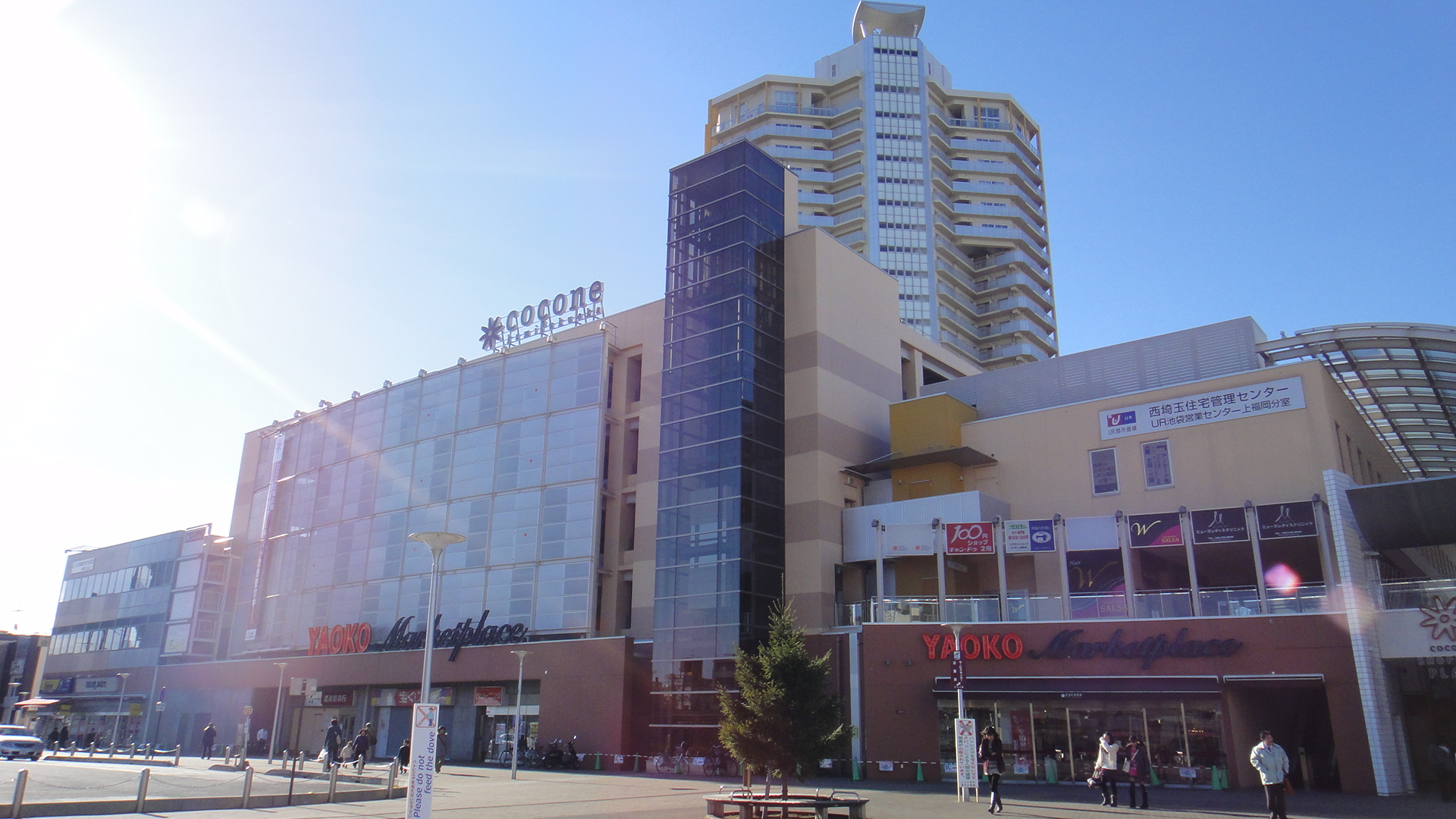
Cocone Kamifukuoka Shopping Centre, January 2011

- Fujimino City Office
- Cocone Kamifukuoka Shopping Centre
- Chuo Park

== See also ==
- List of railway stations in Japan
- Kamifukuoka, Saitama, the former name of the city in which the station is located
