= Tsuruse Station =

Railway station in Fujimi, Saitama Prefecture, Japan

TJ17 Tsuruse Station 鶴瀬駅
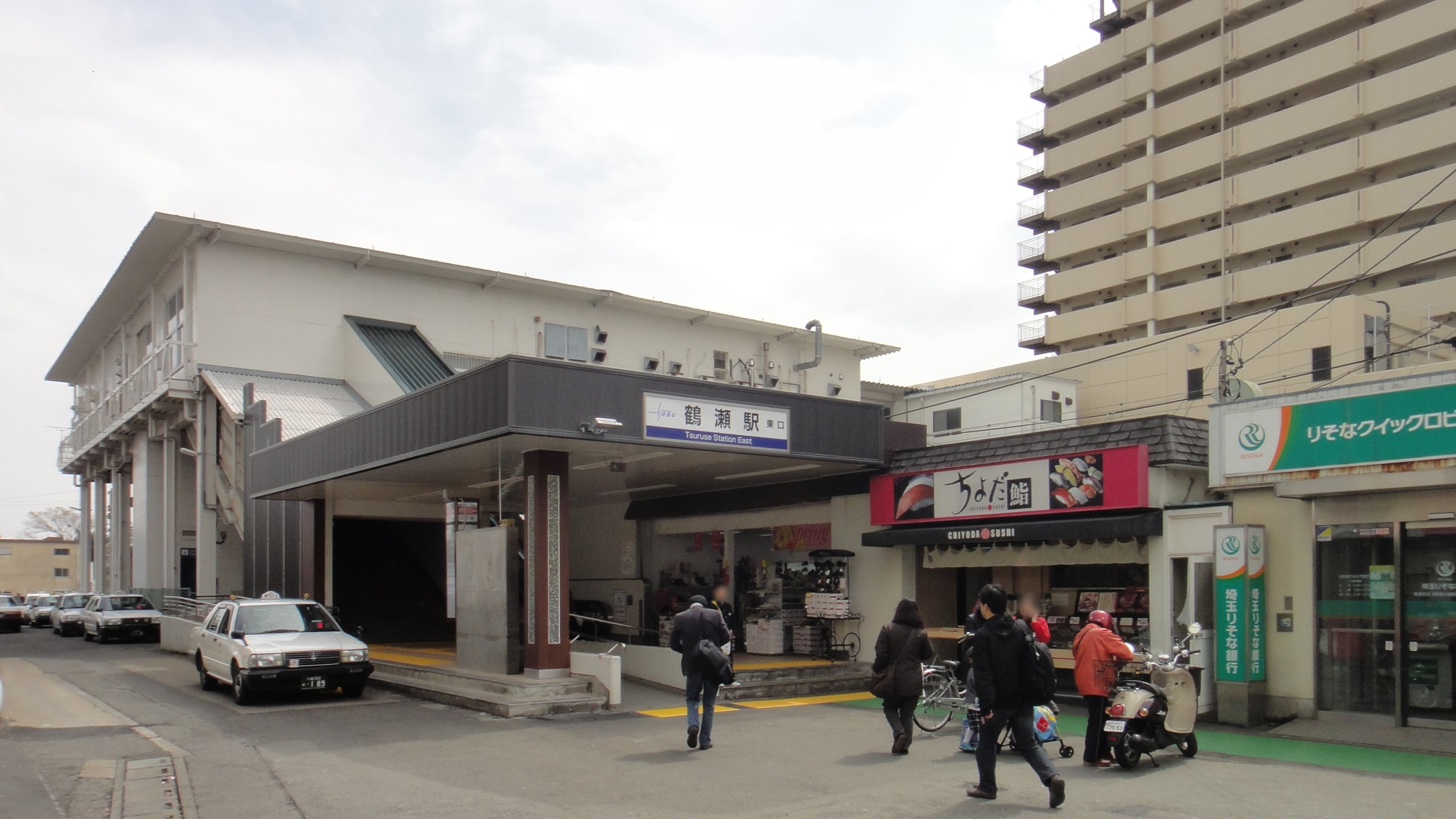
- The east entrance in April 2015

General information
- Location: 1-11-1 Tsuruse-higashi, Fujimi-shi, Saitama-ken 354-0024; Japan
- Coordinates: 35°50′45.16″N 139°32′22.41″E
- Operator: Tōbu Railway
- Line: Tōbu Tōjō Line
- Distance: 22.0 km from Ikebukuro
- Platforms: 1 island platform
- Tracks: 2

Other information
- Station code: TJ-17
- Website: www.tobu.co.jp/station/info/7313.html

History
- Opened: 1 May 1914

Passengers
- FY2019: 50,210 daily

Services
Preceding station	Tobu Railway	Following station
Fujimino TJ18 towards Yorii	Tojo Line Semi Express Local	Mizuhodai TJ16 towards Ikebukuro
Location
- Location within Saitama Prefecture Location within Japan

Tsuruse Station (鶴瀬駅, Tsuruse-eki) is a passenger railway station located in the city of Fujimi, Saitama, Japan, operated by the private railway operator Tōbu Railway.

== Lines ==
Tsuruse Station is served by the Tōbu Tōjō Line from Ikebukuro in Tokyo, with some services inter-running via the Tokyo Metro Yurakucho Line to Shin-Kiba and the Tokyo Metro Fukutoshin Line to Shibuya and onward via the Tokyu Toyoko Line and Minato Mirai Line to Motomachi-Chukagai. Located between Mizuhodai and Fujimino stations, it is 22.0 km from the Ikebukuro terminus. Only Semi Express and Local services stop at this station.

== Station layout ==
The station consists of an island platform serving two tracks. The station building is elevated and located above the platform.

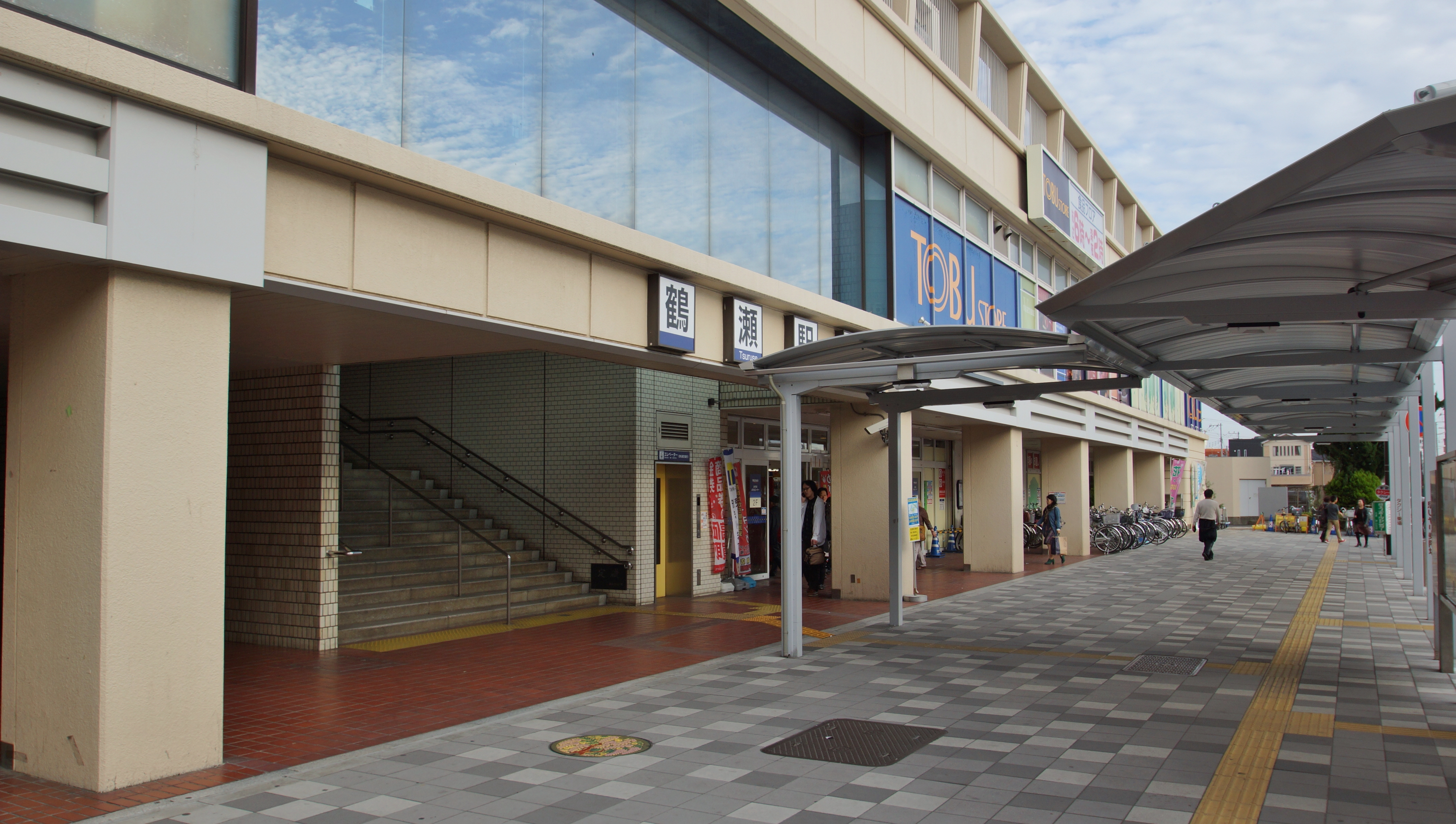
The west entrance in November 2015

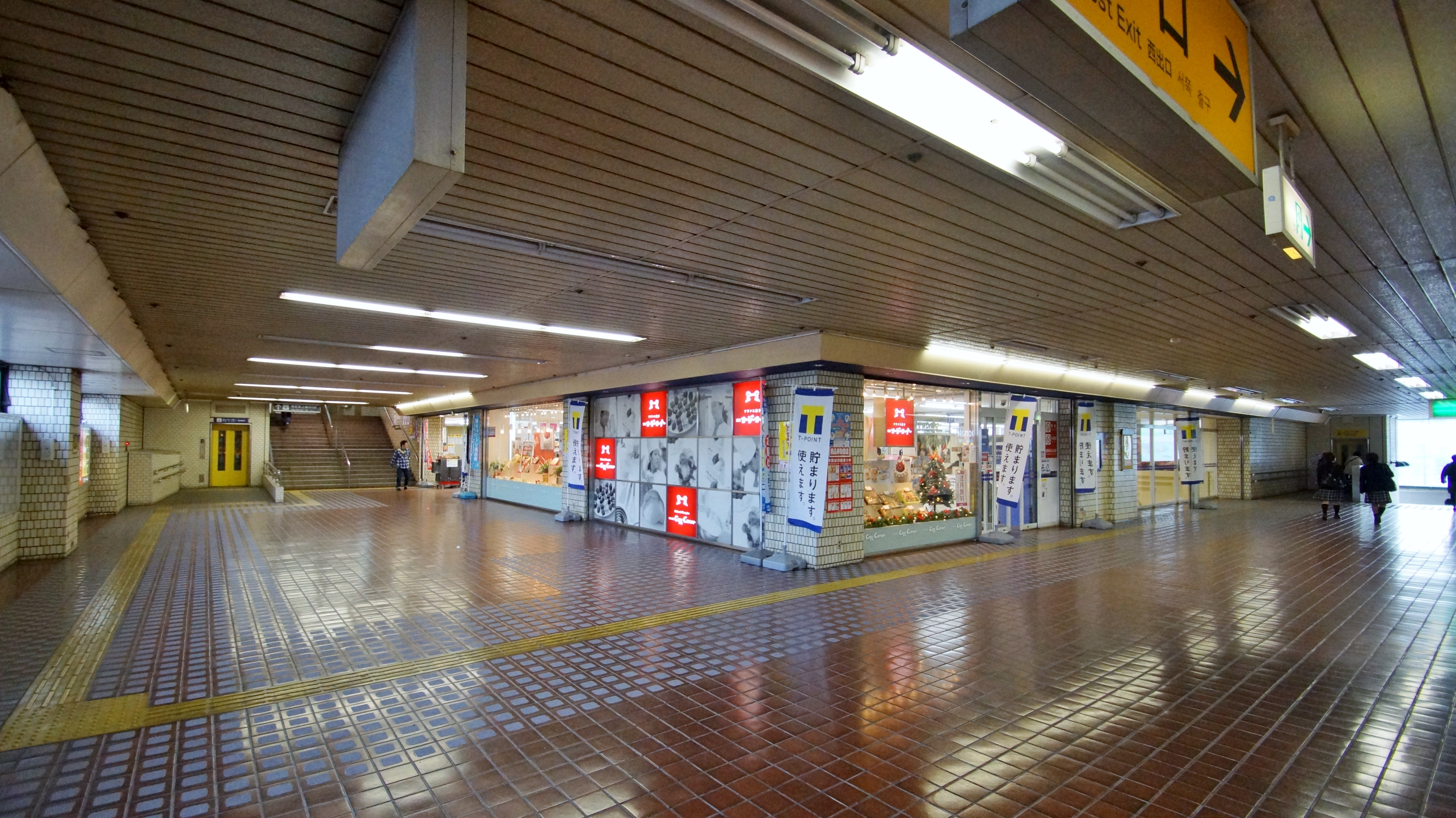
The mezzanine on the west side in November 2015

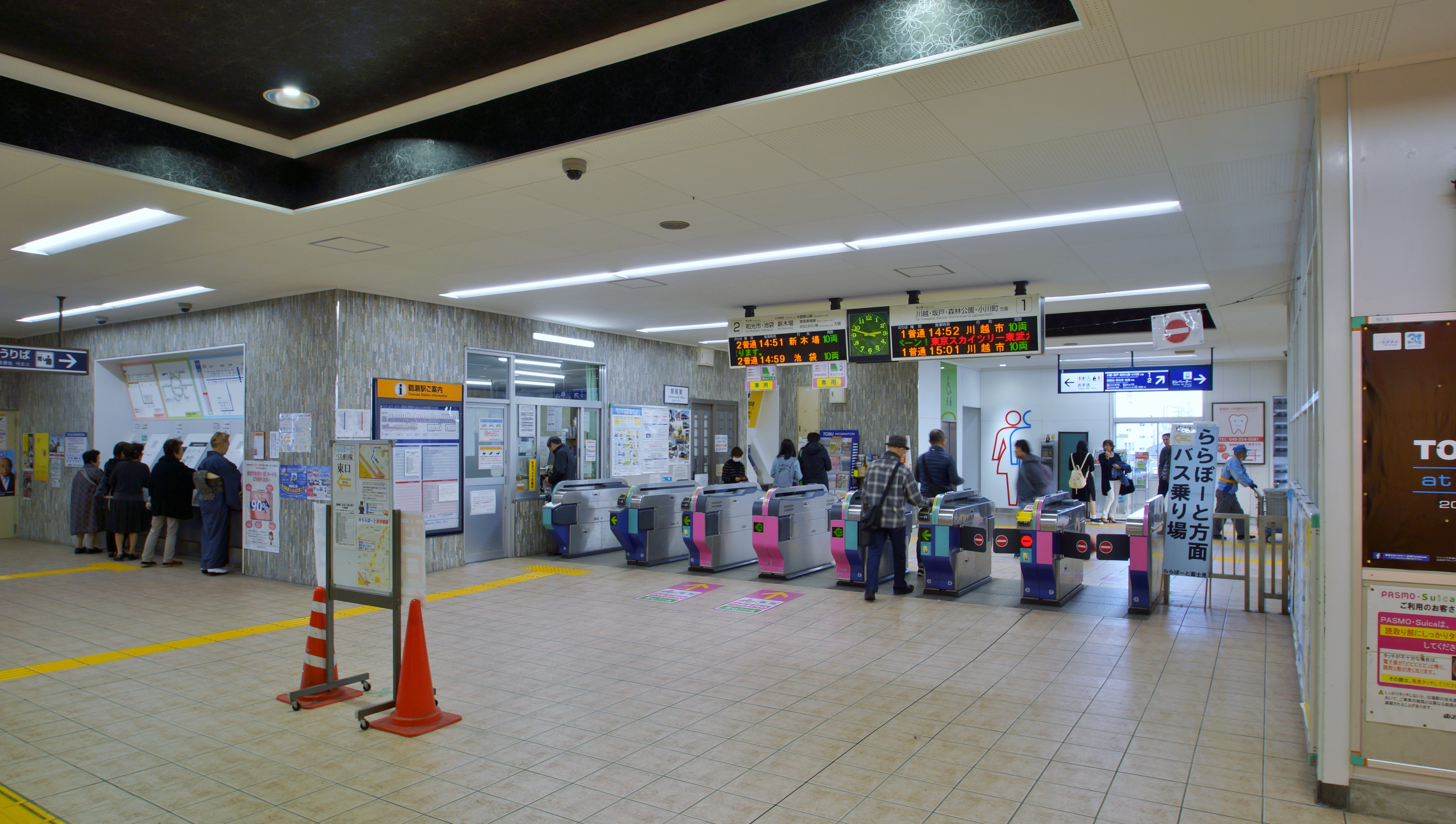
The ticket barriers in November 2015

=== Platforms ===
1	■ Tōbu Tōjō Line	for Fujimino, Kawagoe, Shinrinkōen, Ogawamachi, and Yorii
2	■ Tōbu Tōjō Line	for Shiki, Wakōshi, Narimasu, and Ikebukuro; Tokyo Metro Yurakucho Line for Shin-Kiba; Tokyo Metro Fukutoshin Line for Shibuya; Tōkyū Tōyoko Line for Hiyoshi and Yokohama; Tōkyū Shin-Yokohama Line for Shin-Yokohama via Sōtetsu Shin-Yokohama Line for Shōnandai; Minatomirai Line for Motomachi-Chukagai

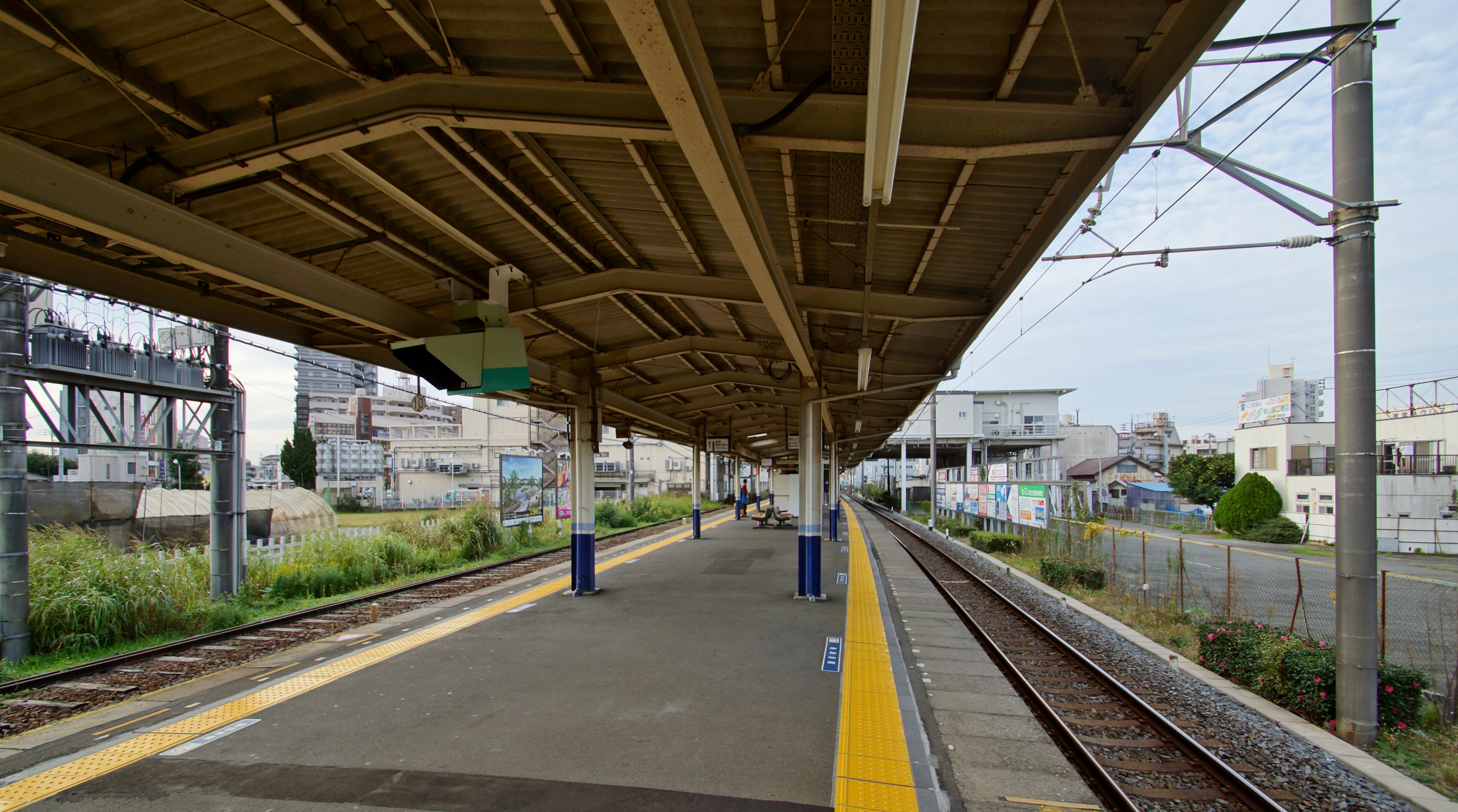
The platforms viewed from the up (Ikebukuro) end in November 2015

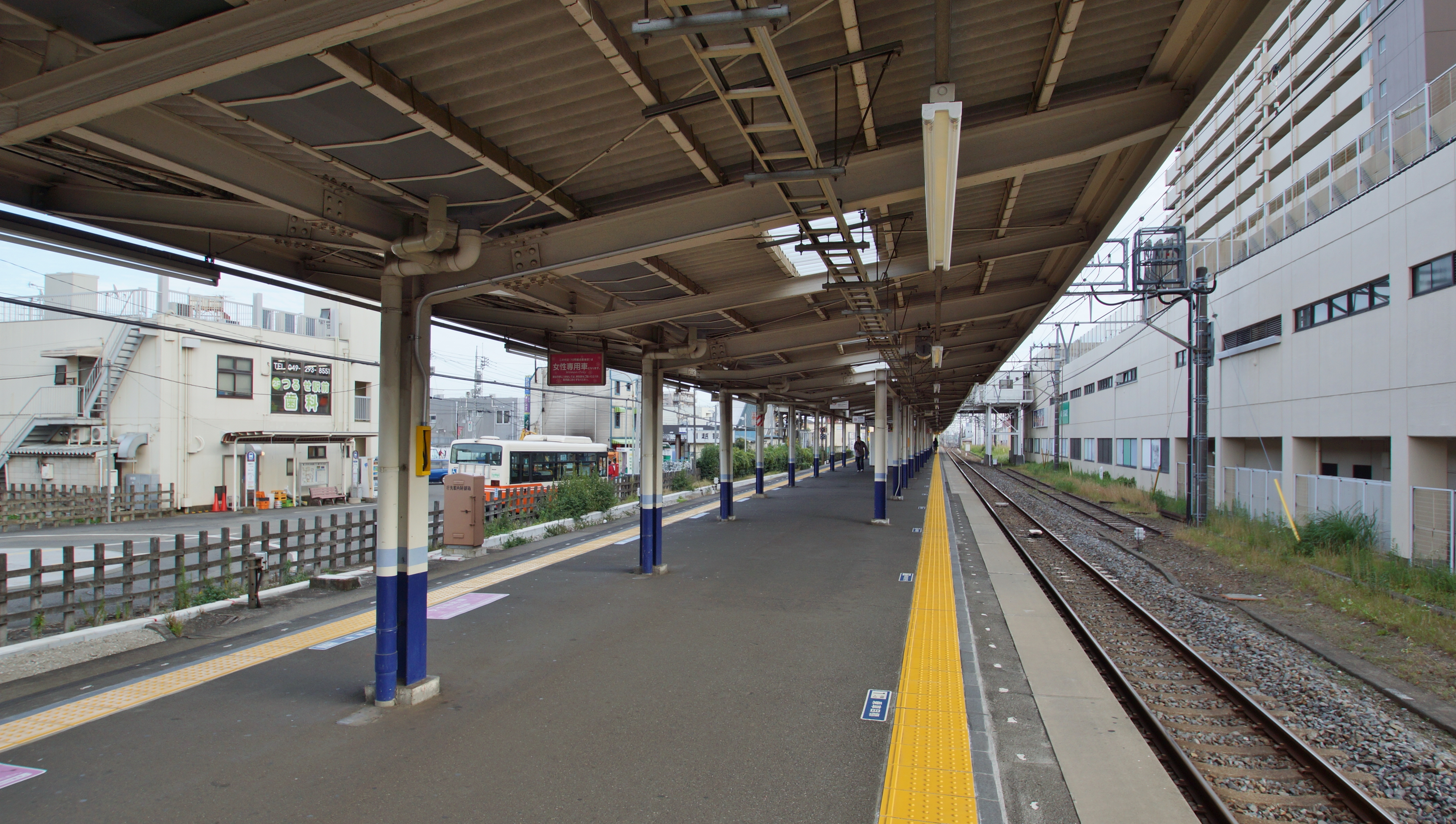
The platforms viewed from the down (Kawagoe) end in November 2015

== History ==
The station opened on 1 May 1914 coinciding with the opening of the Tojo Railway line from Ikebukuro. The west entrance was opened in 1979.

Through-running to and from Shibuya via the Tokyo Metro Fukutoshin Line commenced on 14 June 2008.

From 17 March 2012, station numbering was introduced on the Tōbu Tōjō Line, with Tsuruse Station becoming "TJ-17".

Through-running to and from Yokohama and Motomachi-Chukagai via the Tokyu Toyoko Line and Minatomirai Line commenced on 16 March 2013.

Through service via the Tōkyū Shin-yokohama Line, Sōtetsu Shin-yokohama Line, Sōtetsu Main Line, and Sōtetsu Izumino Line to Shin-Yokohama and Shōnandai commenced on 18 March 2023.

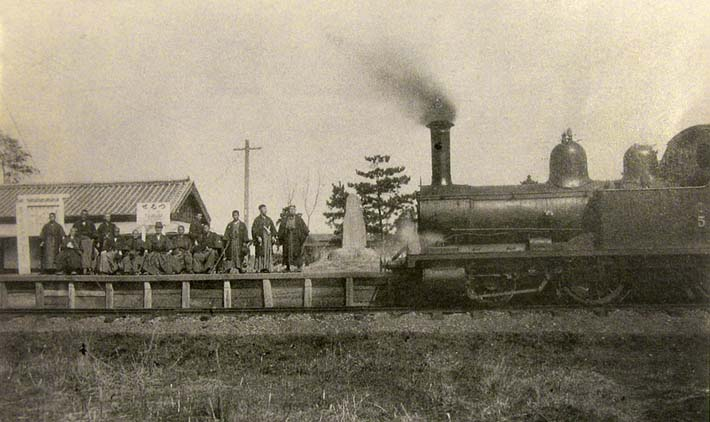
The station in 1918

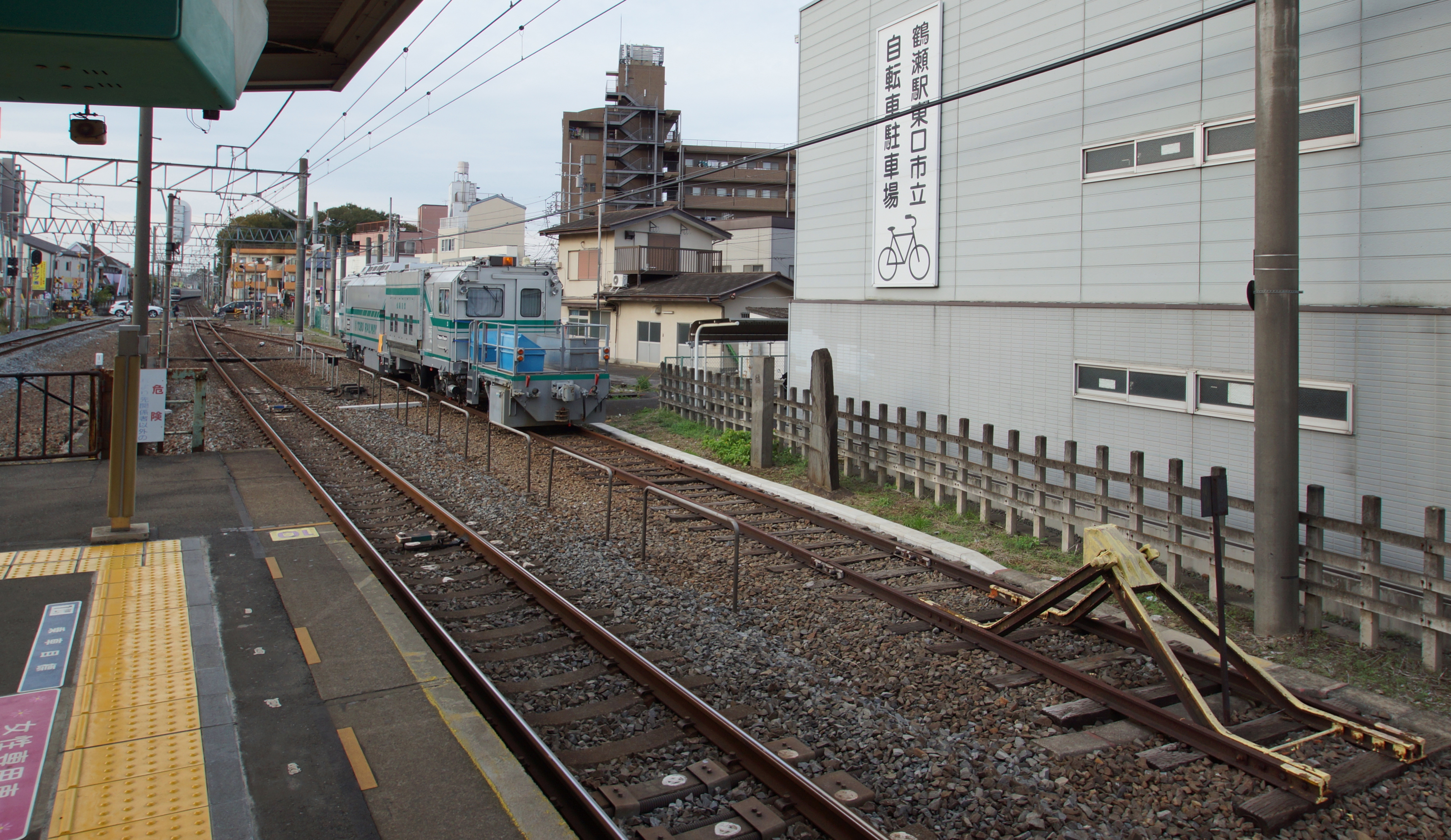
The 1914 opening memorial stone at the north end of the station in November 2015

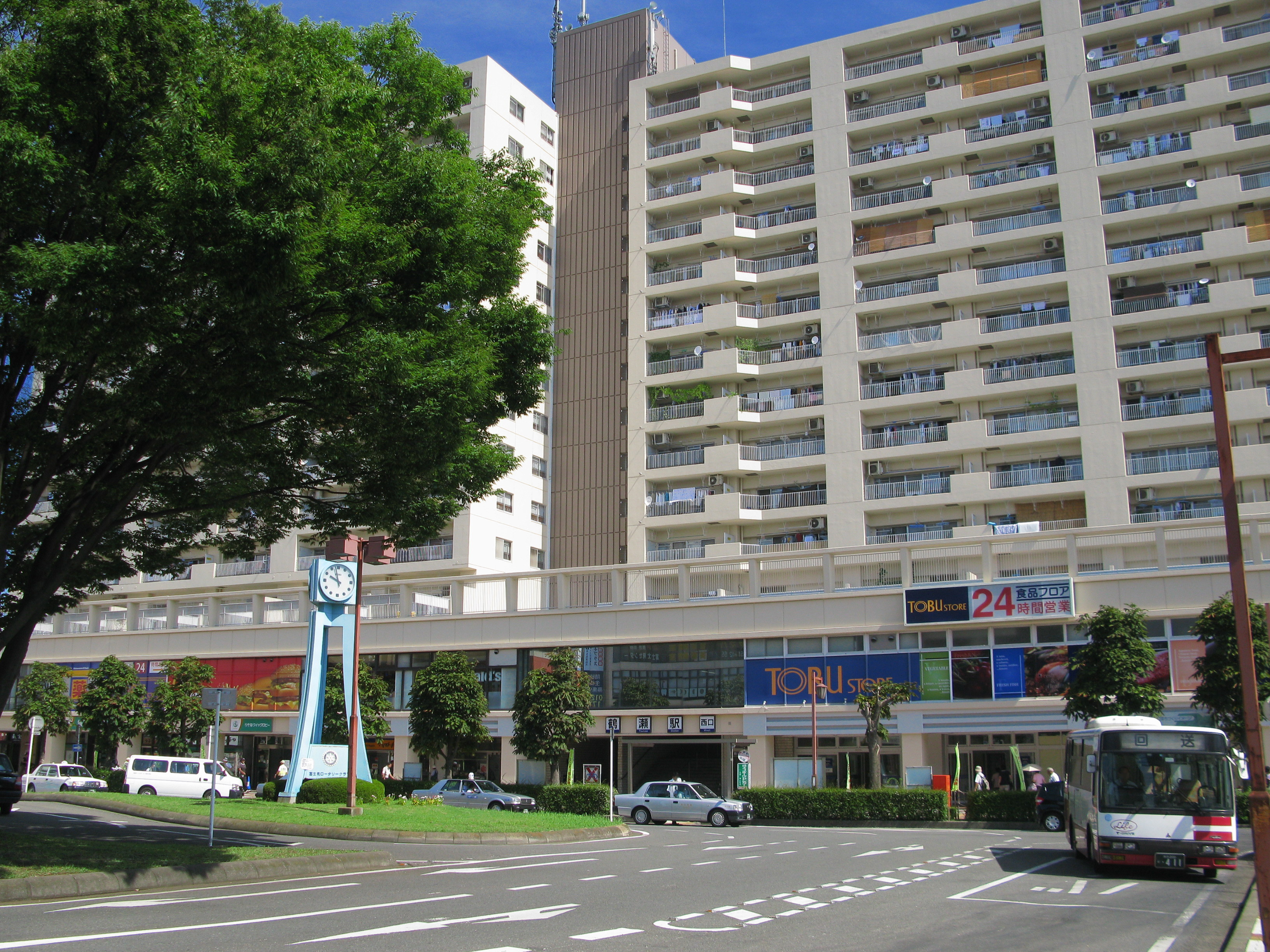
The station forecourt on the west side in September 2012 before remodelling

== Passenger statistics ==
In fiscal 2019, the station was used by an average of 50,210 passengers daily.

== Surrounding area ==
- Fujimi City Office
- National Route 254
- LaLaport Fujimi shopping mall
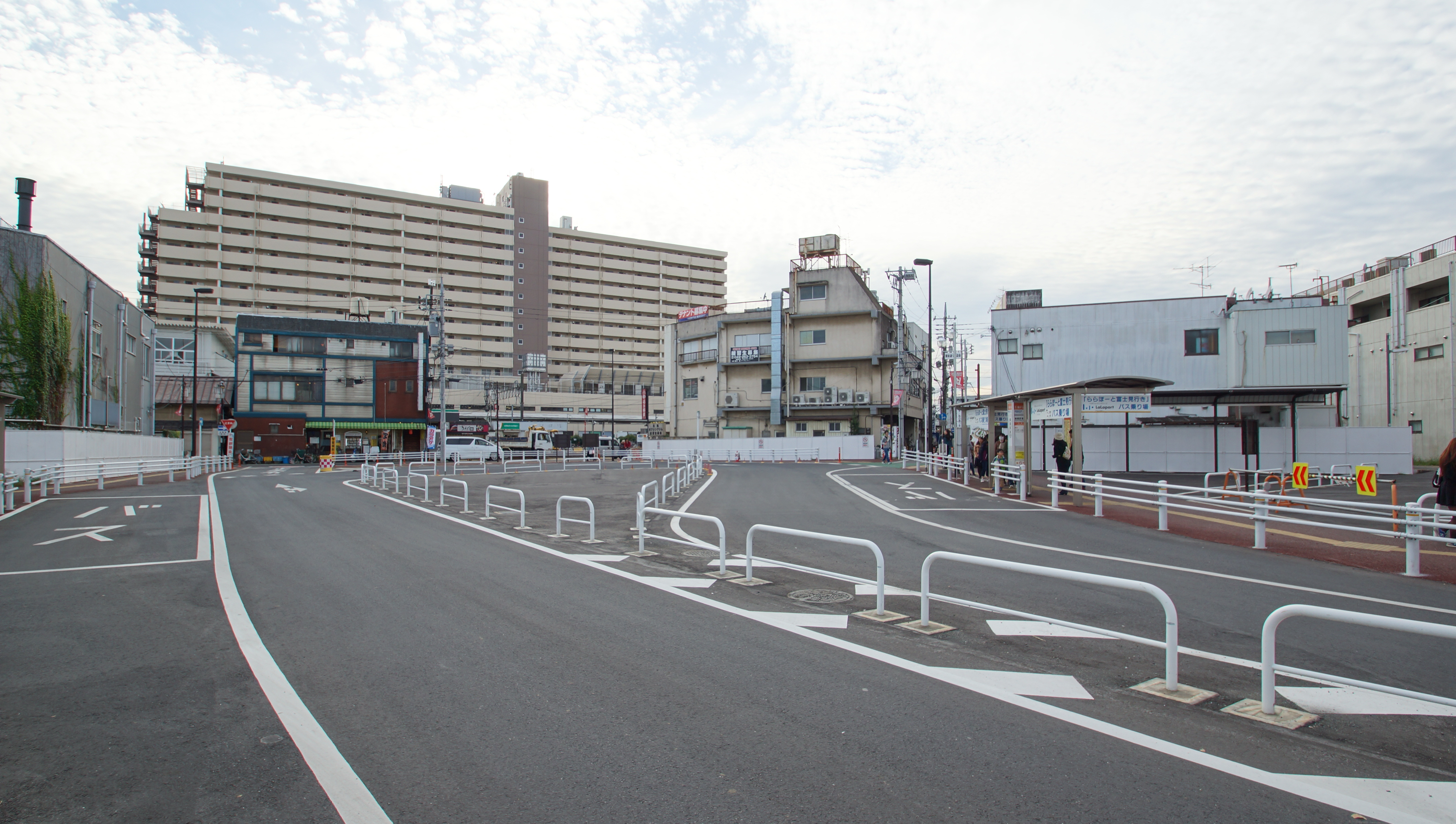
The temporary station forecourt and bus stops on the east side in November 2015

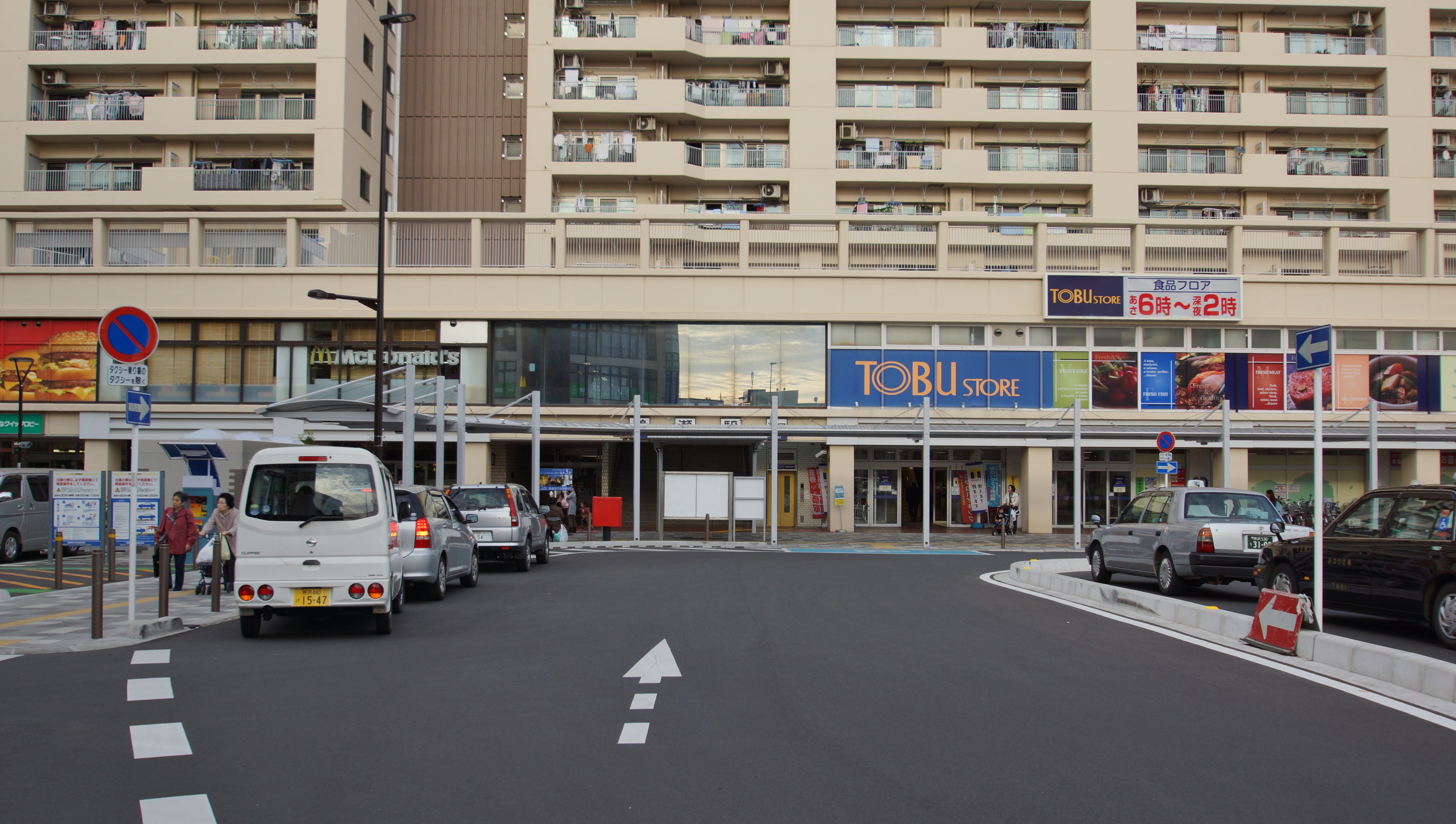
The station forecourt on the west side in November 2015 following remodelling

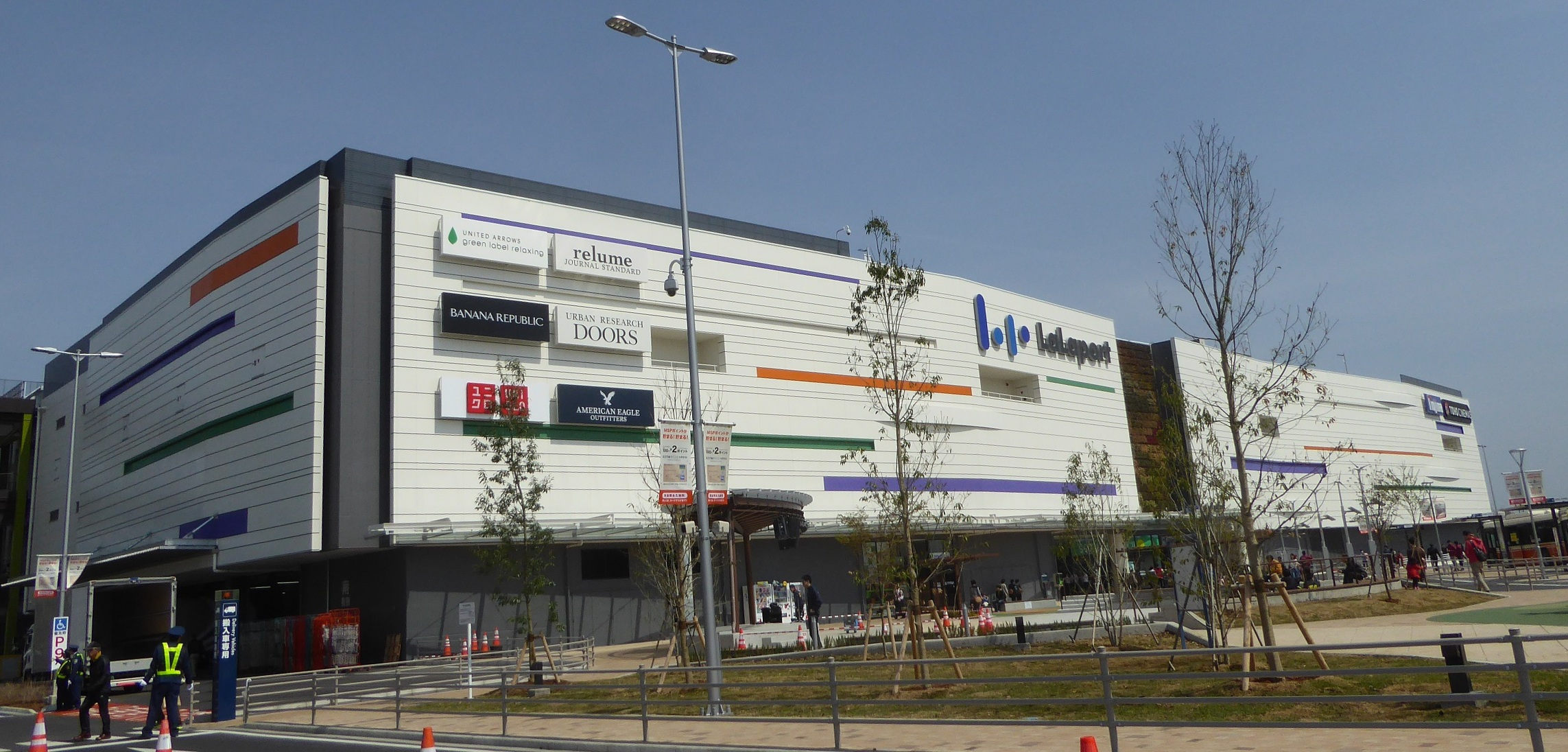
LaLaport Fujimi shopping mall in April 2015

== See also ==
- List of railway stations in Japan
