= Fujimino Station =

Railway station in Fujimi, Saitama Prefecture, Japan

TJ18 Fujimino Station ふじみ野駅
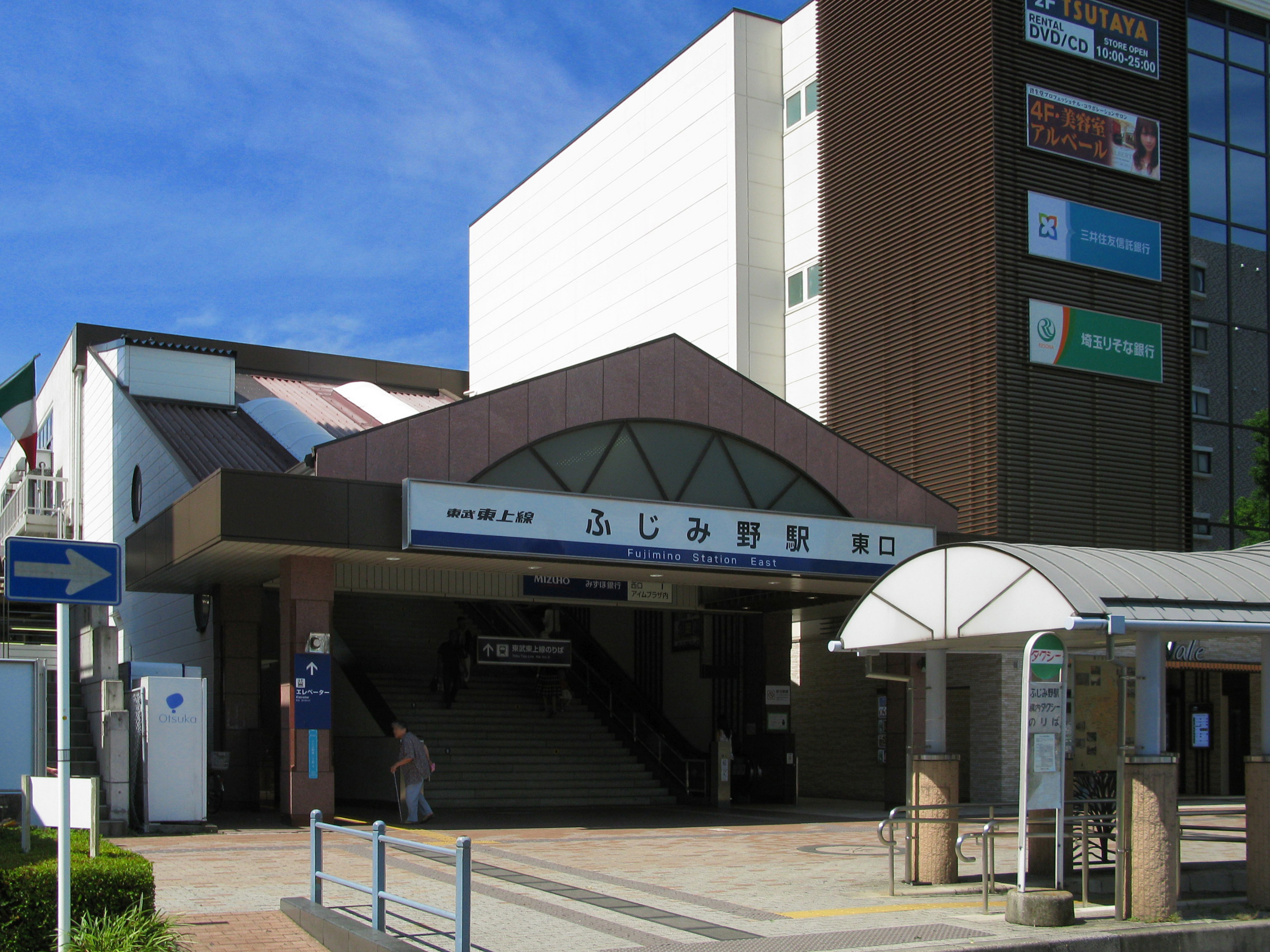
- The east entrance in September 2012

General information
- Location: 1-26-1 Fujimino-higashi, Fujimi-shi, Saitama-ken 354-0036; Japan
- Coordinates: 35.860857°N 139.523138°E
- Operator: Tōbu Railway
- Line: Tōbu Tōjō Line
- Distance: 24.2 km from Ikebukuro
- Platforms: 2 island platforms
- Tracks: 4
- Connections: Bus terminal

Construction
- Structure type: At-grade
- Accessible: Yes

Other information
- Station code: TJ-18
- Website: Official website

History
- Opened: 15 November 1993

Passengers
- FY2019: 66,843 daily

Services
Preceding station	Tobu Railway	Following station
Kawagoe TJ21 towards Ogawamachi	TJ Liner	Ikebukuro TJ01 Terminus
Kawagoe TJ21 towards Yorii	Tojo Line Express	Shiki TJ14 towards Ikebukuro
Kami-Fukuoka TJ19 towards Yorii	Tojo Line Semi Express Local	Tsuruse TJ17 towards Ikebukuro
Location
- Location within Saitama Prefecture Location within Japan

Fujimino Station (ふじみ野駅, Fujimino-eki) is a passenger railway station located in the city of Fujimi, Saitama, Japan, operated by the private railway operator Tōbu Railway. Despite the name, it is not in the city of Fujimino.

== Lines ==
Fujimino Station is served by the Tōbu Tōjō Line from Ikebukuro in Tokyo, with some services inter-running via the Tokyo Metro Yurakucho Line to Shin-Kiba and the Tokyo Metro Fukutoshin Line to Shibuya and onward via the Tokyu Toyoko Line and Minato Mirai Line to Motomachi-Chukagai or via the Tōkyū Tōyoko Line, Tōkyū Shin-Yokohama Line, and Sōtetsu Shin-Yokohama Line for Shōnandai . Located between Tsuruse and Kami-Fukuoka, it is 24.2 km from the Ikebukuro terminus. All services except "Rapid Express" and "Kawagoe Limited Express" services stop at this station.

== Station layout ==
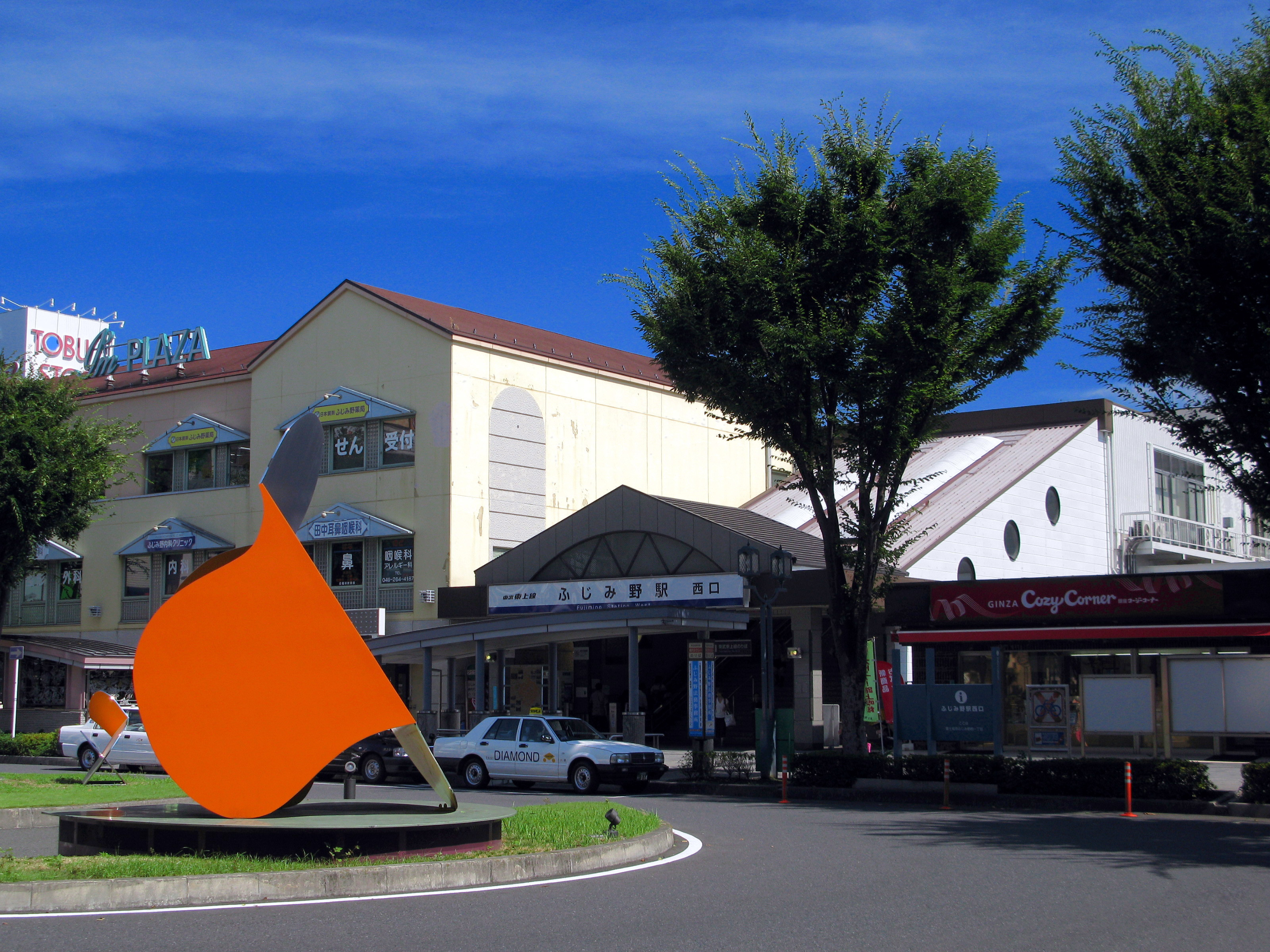
The west entrance in September 2012

The station consists of two island platforms serving four tracks, with an elevated station building located over the platforms. Platforms 1 and 4 are generally used by slower stopping trains overtaken by faster limited-stop trains.

=== Platforms ===
1/2	Tōbu Tōjō Line	for Kawagoe, Sakado, Shinrinkōen, and Ogawamachi
3/4	Tōbu Tōjō Line	for Wakōshi, Narimasu, and Ikebukuro; Tokyo Metro Yurakucho Line for Shin-Kiba; Tokyo Metro Fukutoshin Line for Shibuya; Tōkyū Tōyoko Line for Hiyoshi and Yokohama; Tōkyū Shin-Yokohama Line for Shin-Yokohama via Sōtetsu Shin-Yokohama Line for Shōnandai; Minatomirai Line for Motomachi-Chukagai

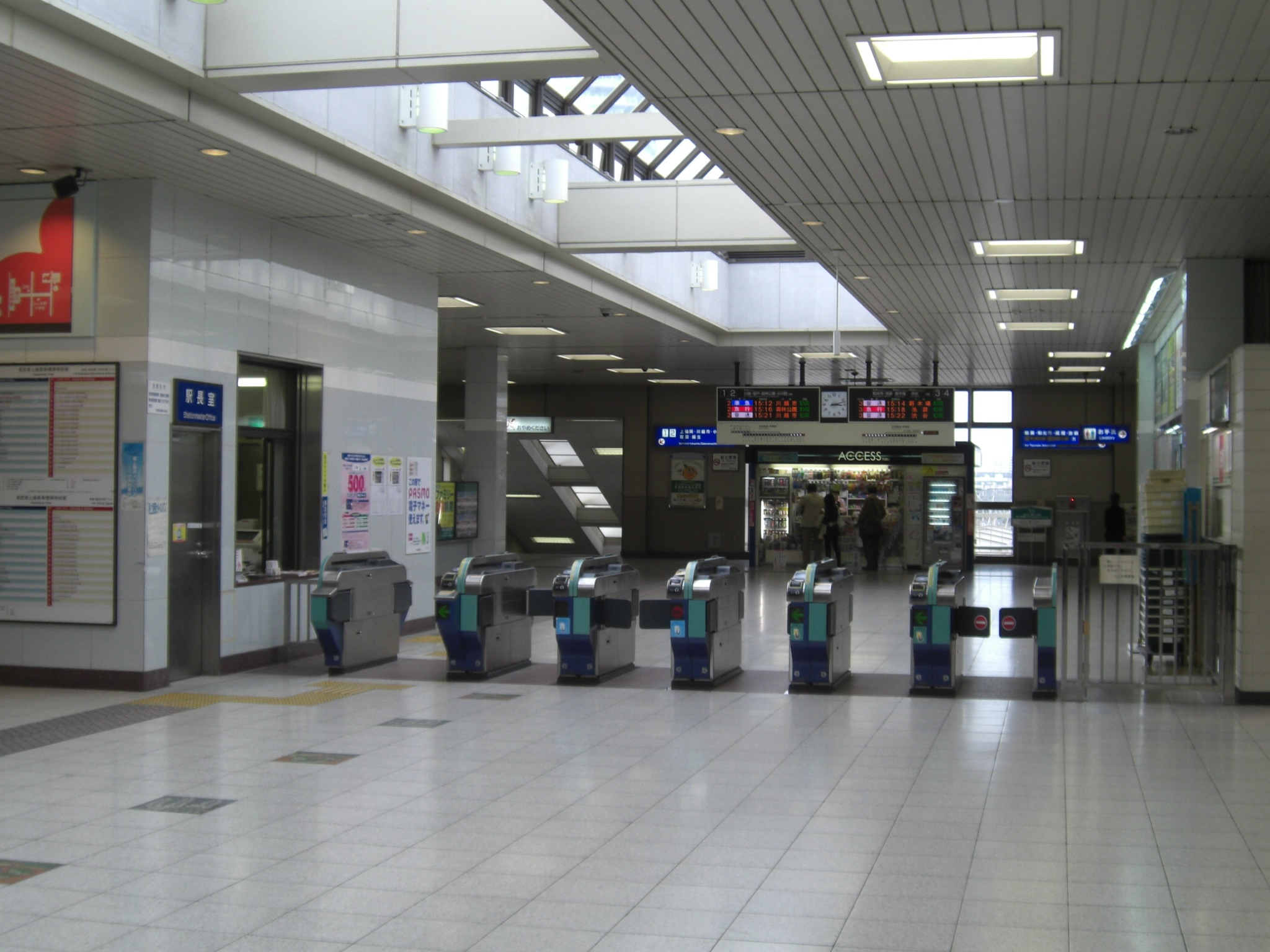
The ticket barriers in October 2009

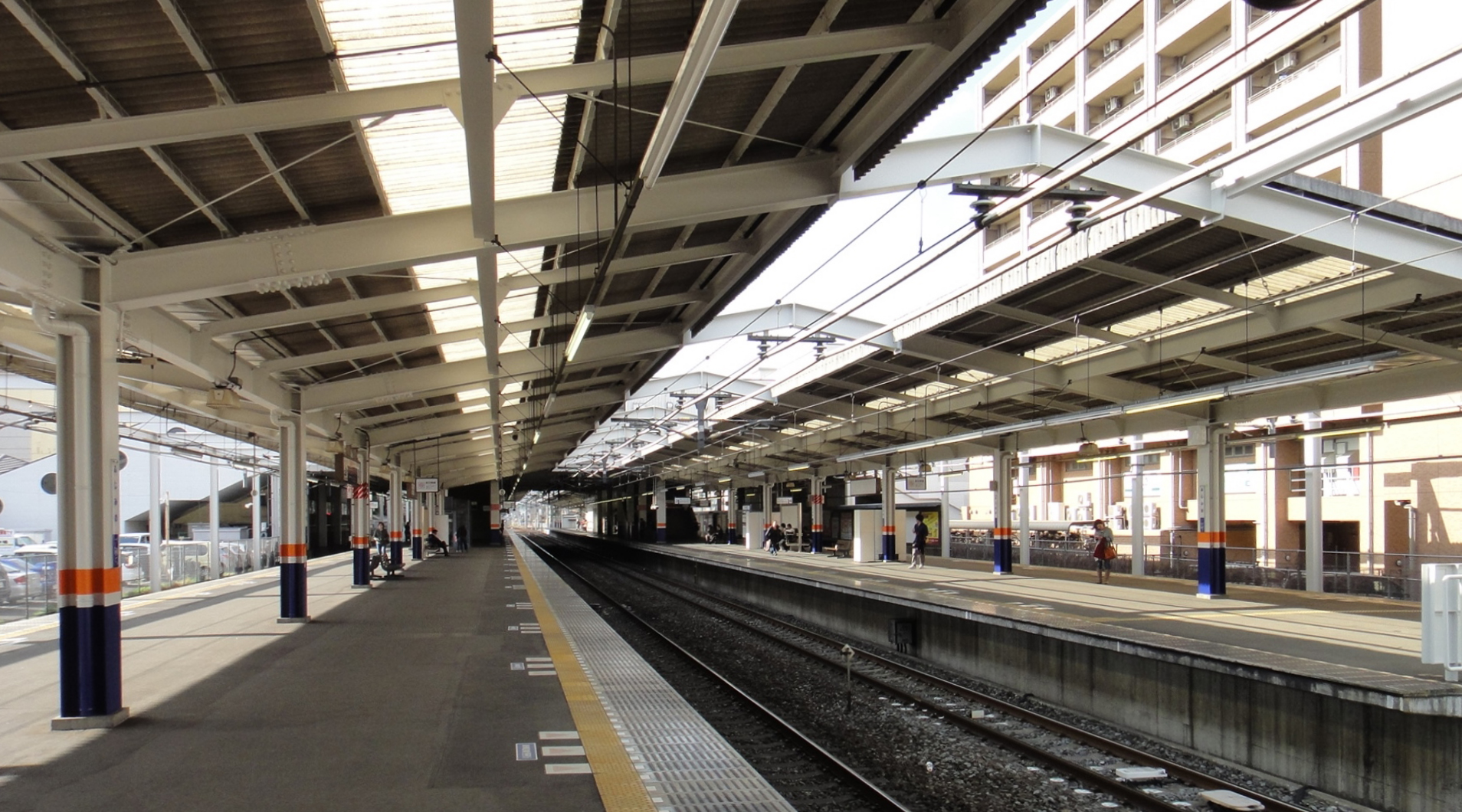
View looking toward Kawagoe from platforms 1 and 2 in April 2013

== History ==
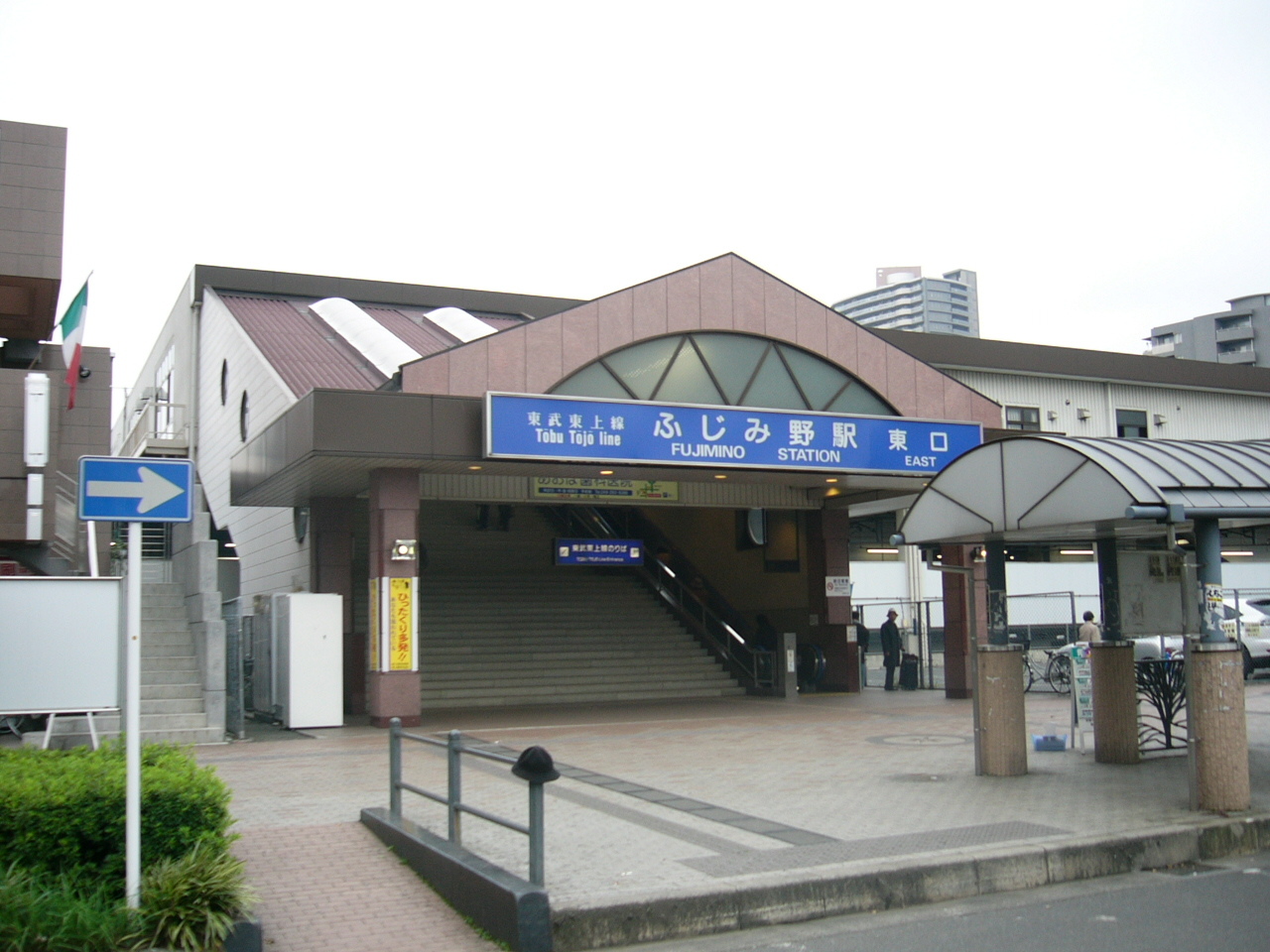
The east entrance in November 2004

The station opened on 15 November 1993.

Through-running to and from Shibuya via the Tokyo Metro Fukutoshin Line commenced on 14 June 2008.

From 17 March 2012, station numbering was introduced on the Tōbu Tōjō Line, with Fujimino Station becoming "TJ-18".

Through-running to and from Yokohama and Motomachi-Chukagai via the Tokyu Toyoko Line and Minatomirai Line commenced on 16 March 2013.

Through service to and from Shin-Yokohama and Shōnandai via the Tōkyū Shin-yokohama Line, Sōtetsu Shin-yokohama Line, Sōtetsu Main Line, and Sōtetsu Izumino Line commenced on 18 March 2023.

== Passenger statistics ==
In fiscal 2019, the station was used by an average of 66,843 passengers daily. The passenger figures for previous years are as shown below.

Fiscal year	Daily average
2014	64,904
2015	65,874

== Surrounding area ==
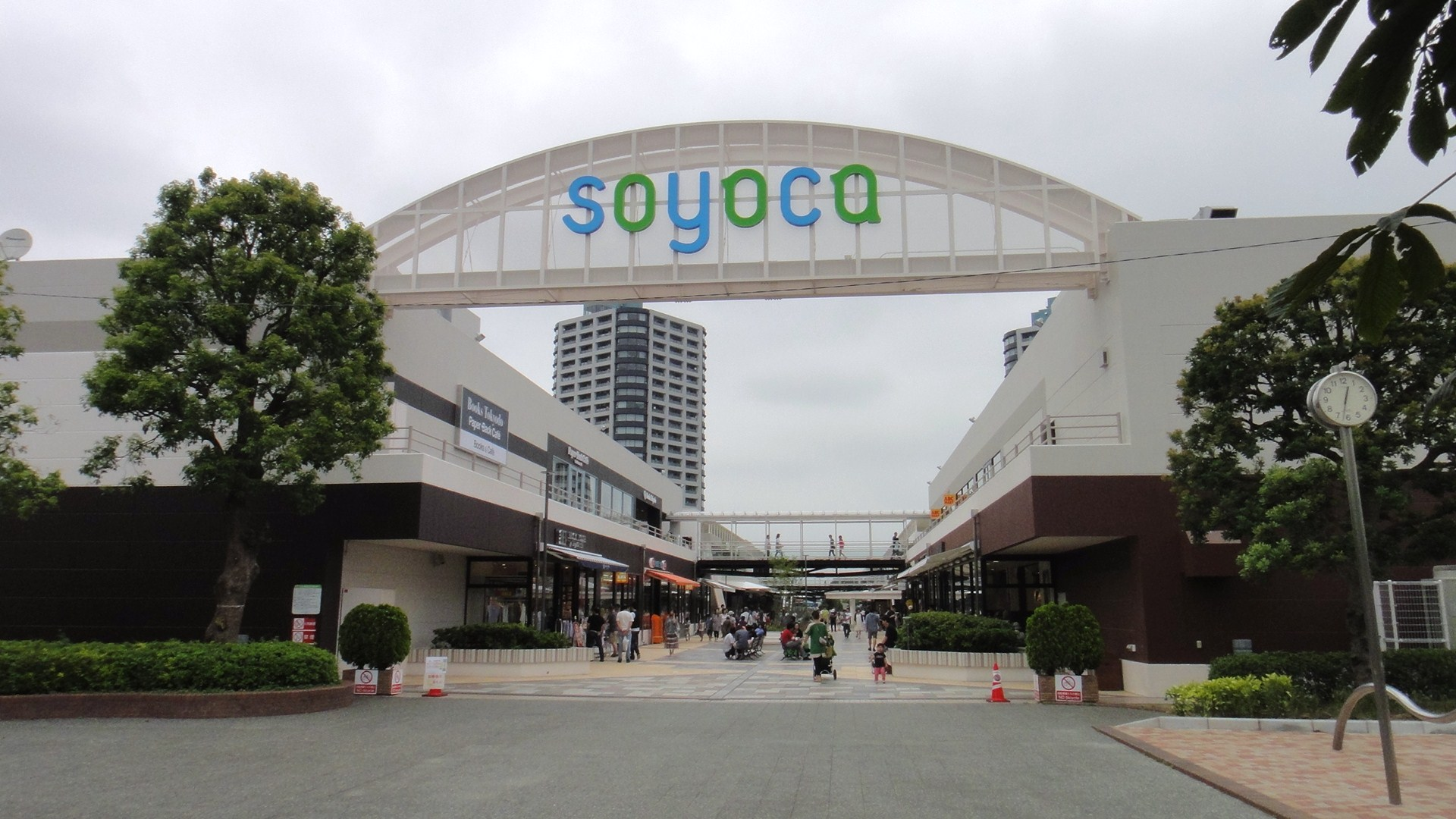
Soyoca Fujimino Shopping Centre in July 2012

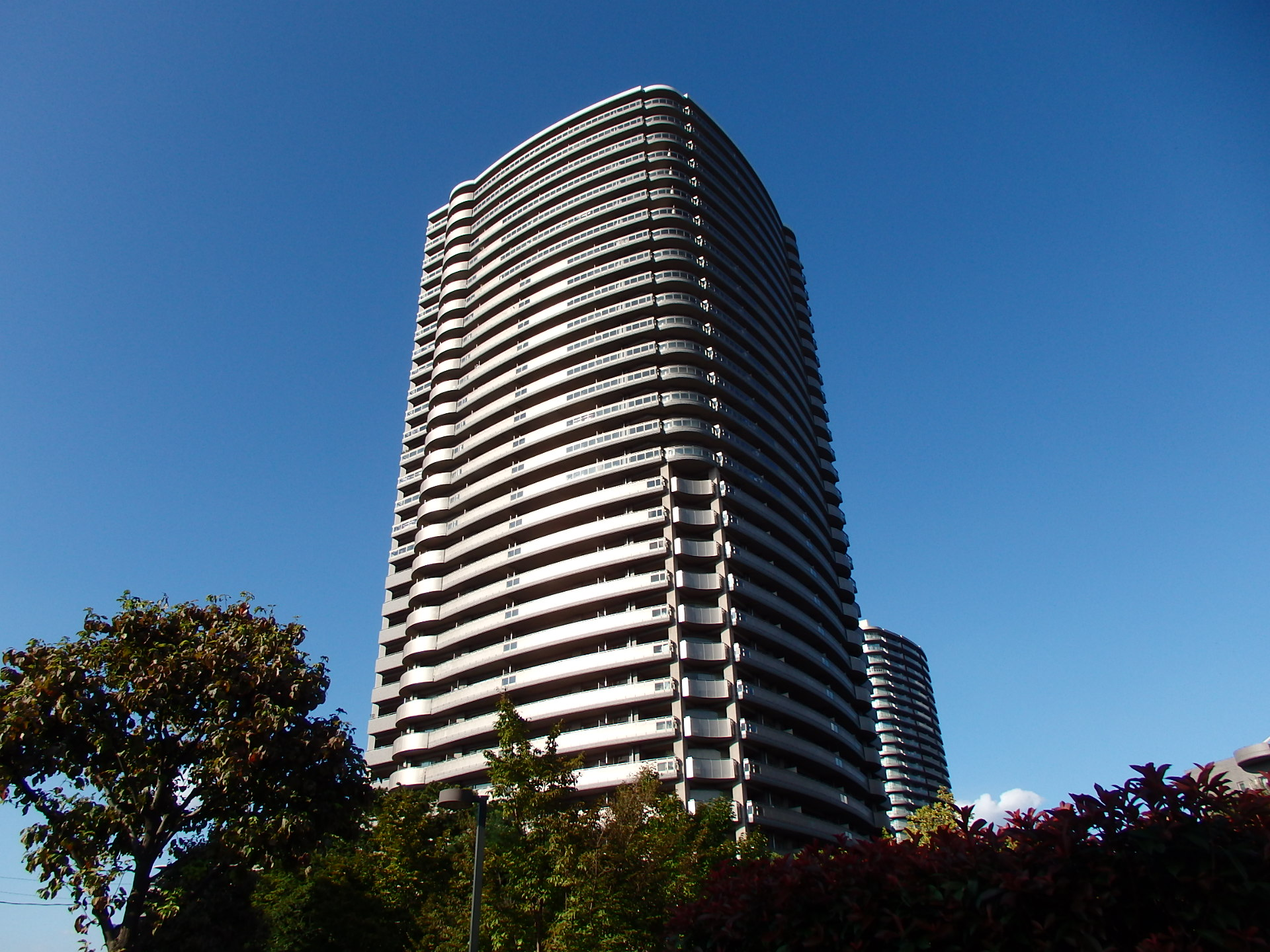
The "I'm Fujimino" high-rise condominium in September 2015

- Bunkyo Gakuin University Fujimino Campus
- Soyoca Fujimino Shopping Centre (formerly Outlet Mall Rism, Japan's first outlet shopping mall)
- Lalaport Fujimi shopping mall
- I'm Fujimino (high-rise condominium)

=== Schools ===
- Oi Higashi Junior High School
- Oi Junior High School
- Fujimino Elementary School
- Oi Elementary School
- Kamekubo Elementary School

== Bus services ==
Since 17 July 2008, there is a direct express bus service to/from Narita Airport (via Shiki and Asakadai Stations). The bus stop is on the west side of the station.

There is a regular bus service to/from Lalaport Fujimi. The bus stop is on the east side of the station. There is a regular bus service to/from Tsuruse Station and Kami-Fukuoka Station. The bus stop is on the west side of the station.

== See also ==
- List of railway stations in Japan
