= Tōbu-Nerima Station =

Railway station in Tokyo, Japan

Coordinates: 35°46′07″N 139°39′43″E

TJ08 Tōbu-Nerima Station 東武練馬駅
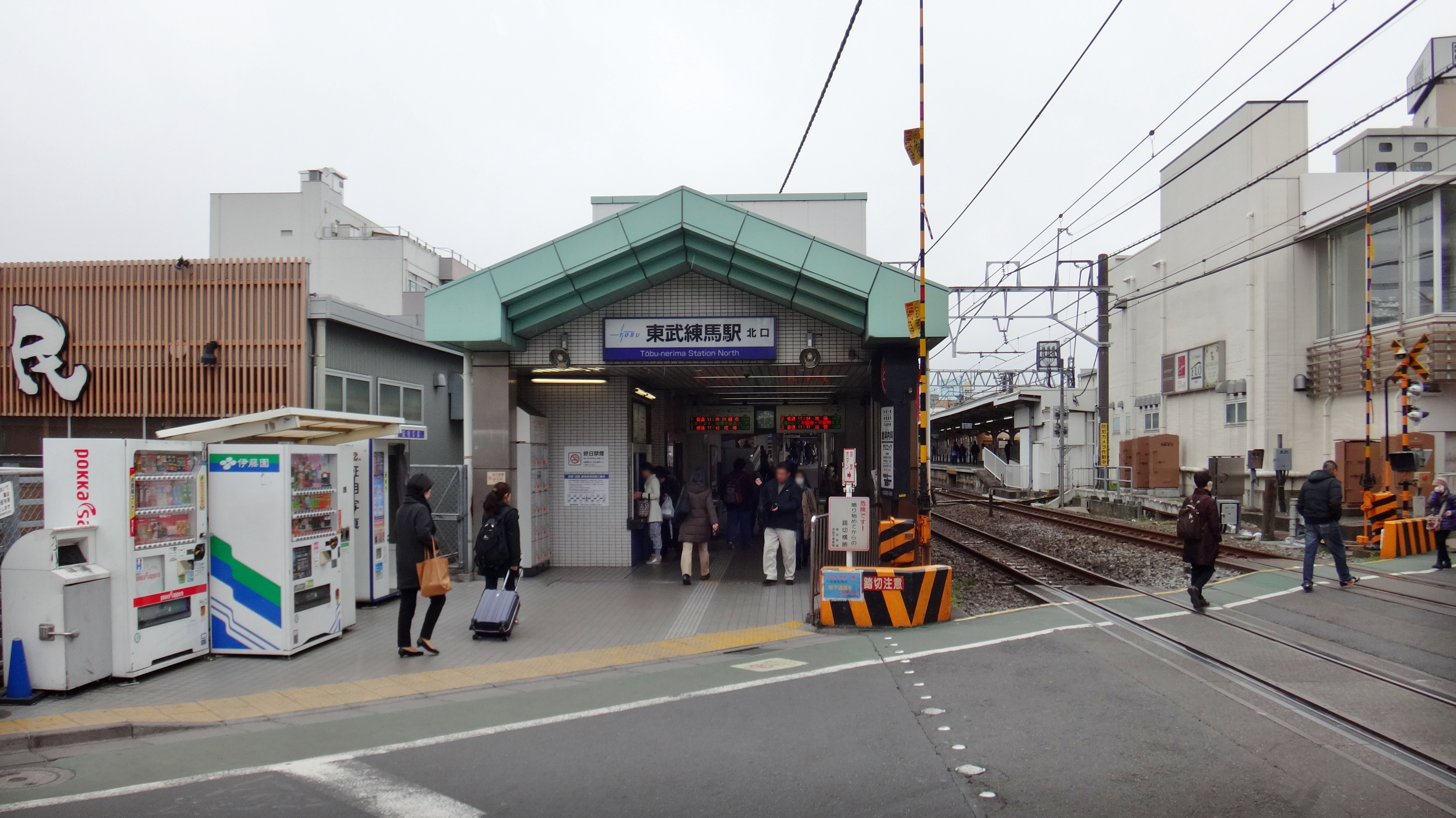
- The north entrance in February 2016

General information
- Location: 2-2-14 Tokumaru, Itabashi-ku, Tokyo 175-0083; Japan
- Operator: Tobu Railway
- Line: Tobu Tojo Line
- Distance: 7.4 km from Ikebukuro
- Platforms: 2 side platforms
- Tracks: 2

Other information
- Station code: TJ-08
- Website: Official website

History
- Opened: 29 December 1931; 94 years ago

Passengers
- FY2014: 59,102 daily

Services
Preceding station	Tobu Railway	Following station
Shimo-Akatsuka TJ09 towards Yorii	Tojo Line Local	Kami-Itabashi TJ07 towards Ikebukuro
Location
- Location within Japan

Tōbu-Nerima Station (東武練馬駅, Tōbu-Nerima-eki) is a railway station on the Tobu Tojo Line in Itabashi, Tokyo, Japan, operated by the private railway operator Tobu Railway. Despite its name, the station is not actually located in Nerima, Tokyo.

== Lines ==
Tōbu-Nerima Station is served by the Tobu Tojo Line from Ikebukuro in Tokyo. Located between Kami-Itabashi and Shimo-Akatsuka, it is 7.4 km from the Ikebukuro terminus. Only "Local" (all-stations) services stop at this station, with eight trains per hour in each direction during the daytime.

== Station layout ==
The station consists of two ground-level side platforms serving two tracks. The station has two entrances, "north" and "south", connected directly to platforms 2 and 1 respectively. The platforms are also linked by an underpass.

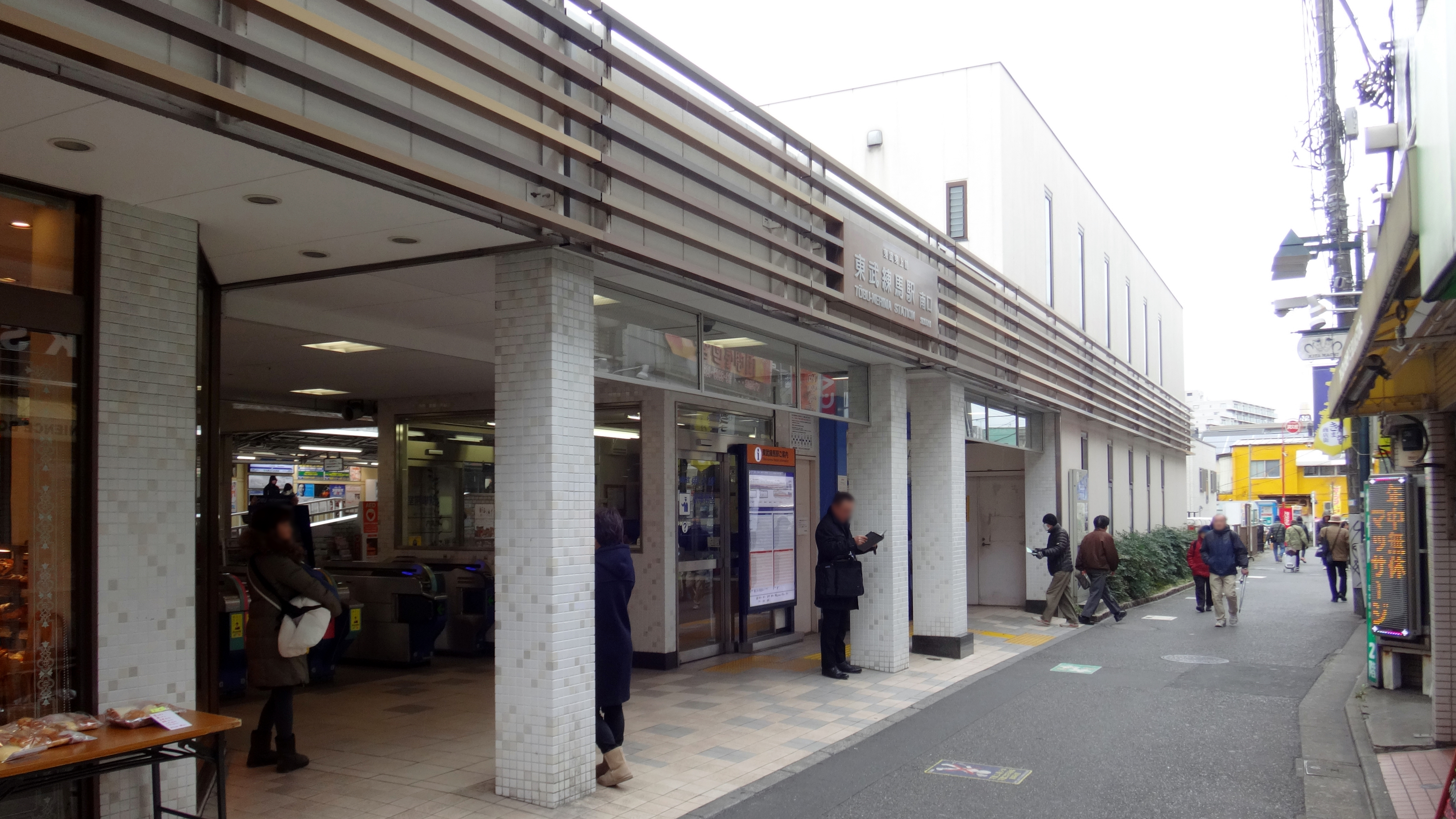
The south entrance in February 2016

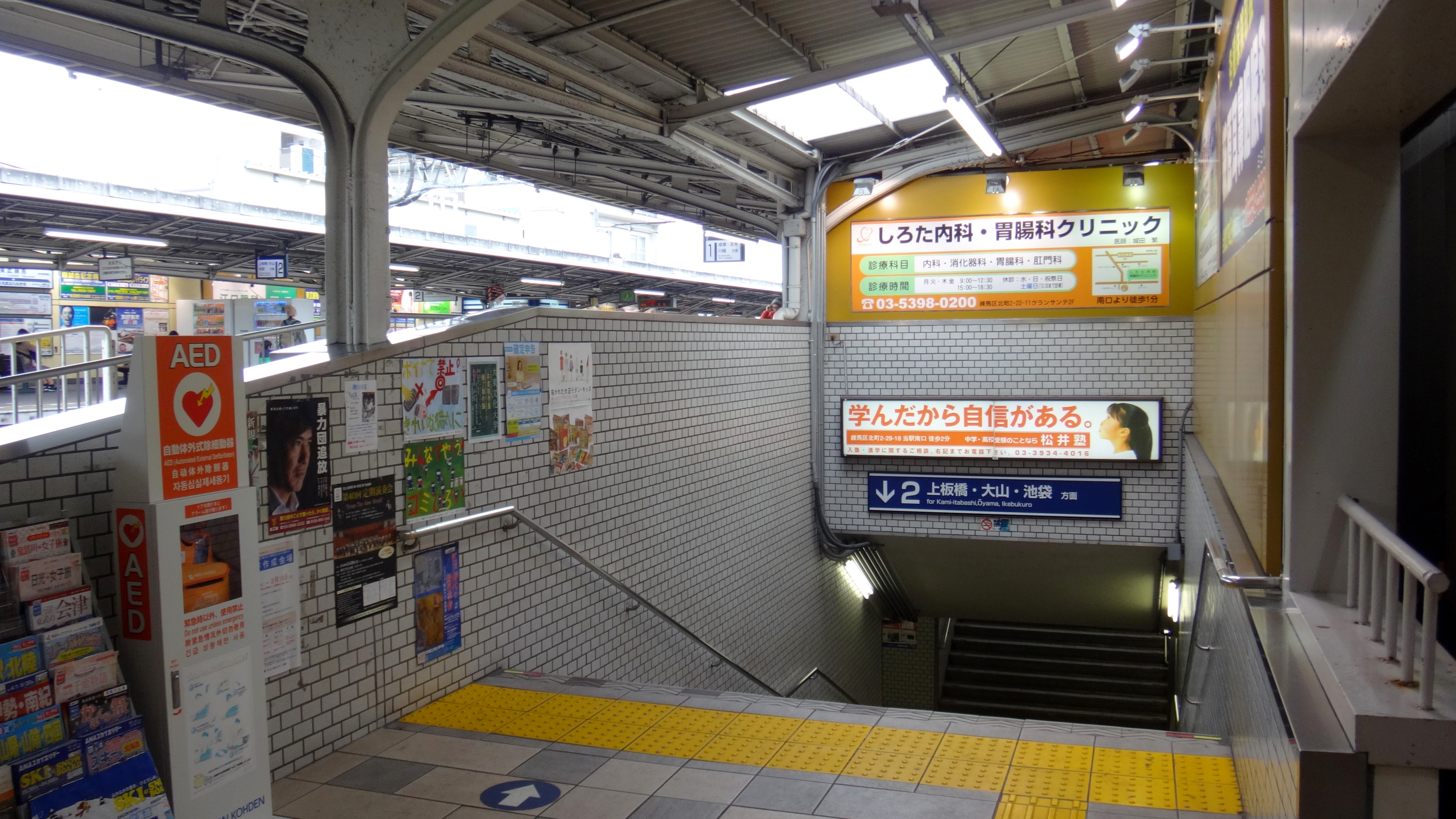
The underpass from platform 1 to platform 2 in February 2016

=== Platforms ===
1	Tobu Tojo Line	for Narimasu and Shiki
2	Tobu Tojo Line	for Kami-Itabashi and Ikebukuro

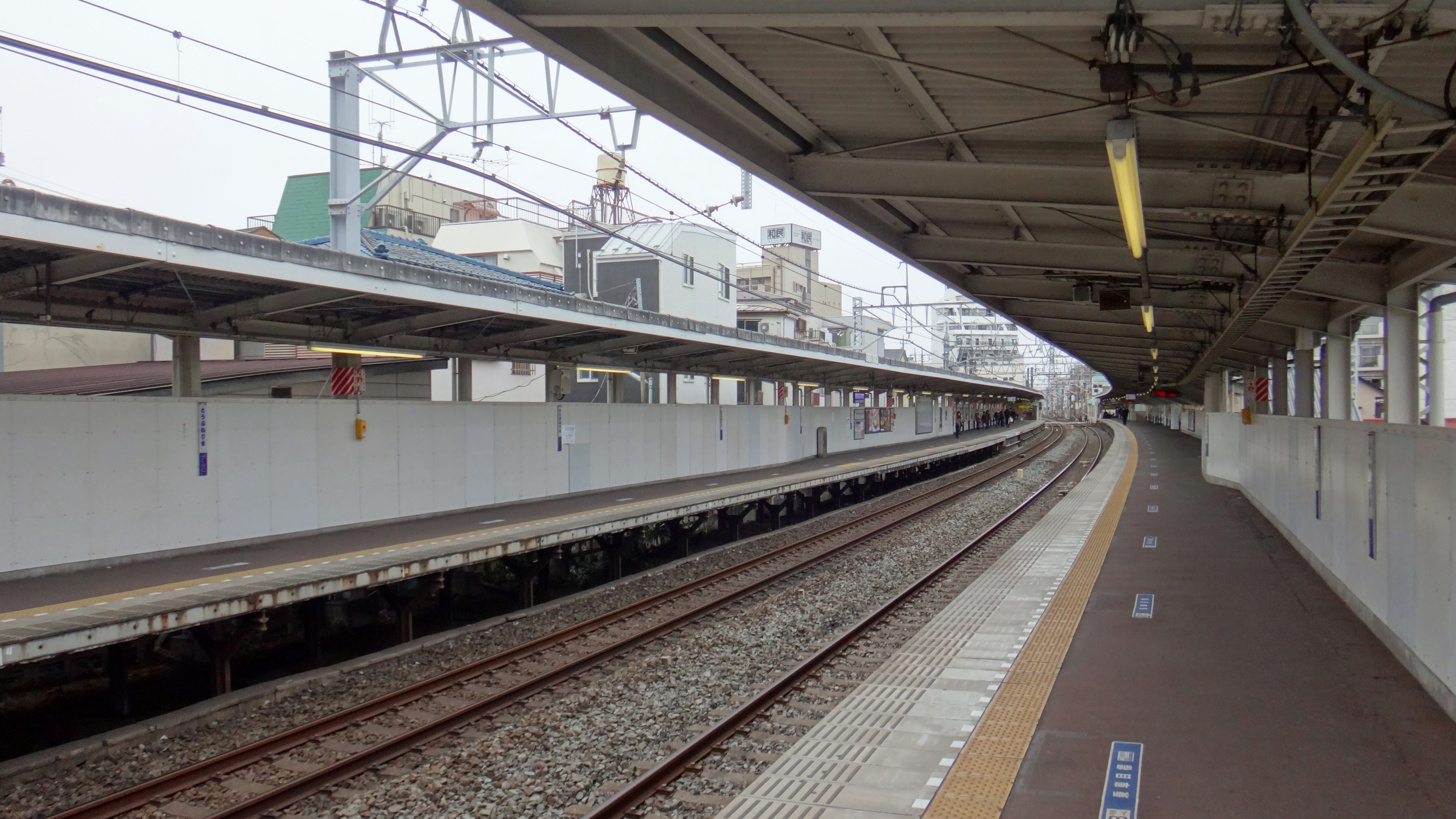
The view from the up end of platform 2 in February 2016

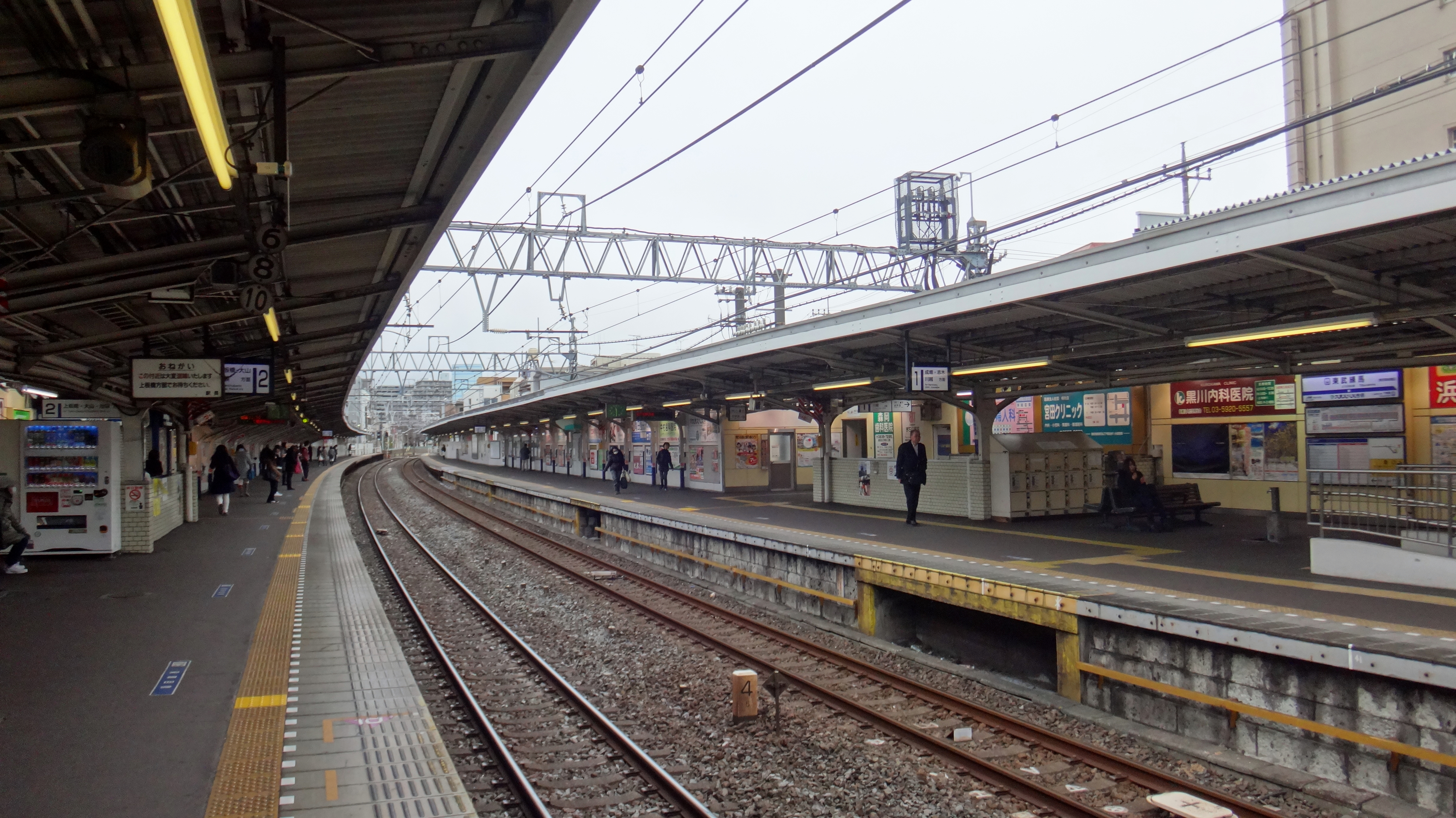
The view from the down end of platform 2 in February 2016

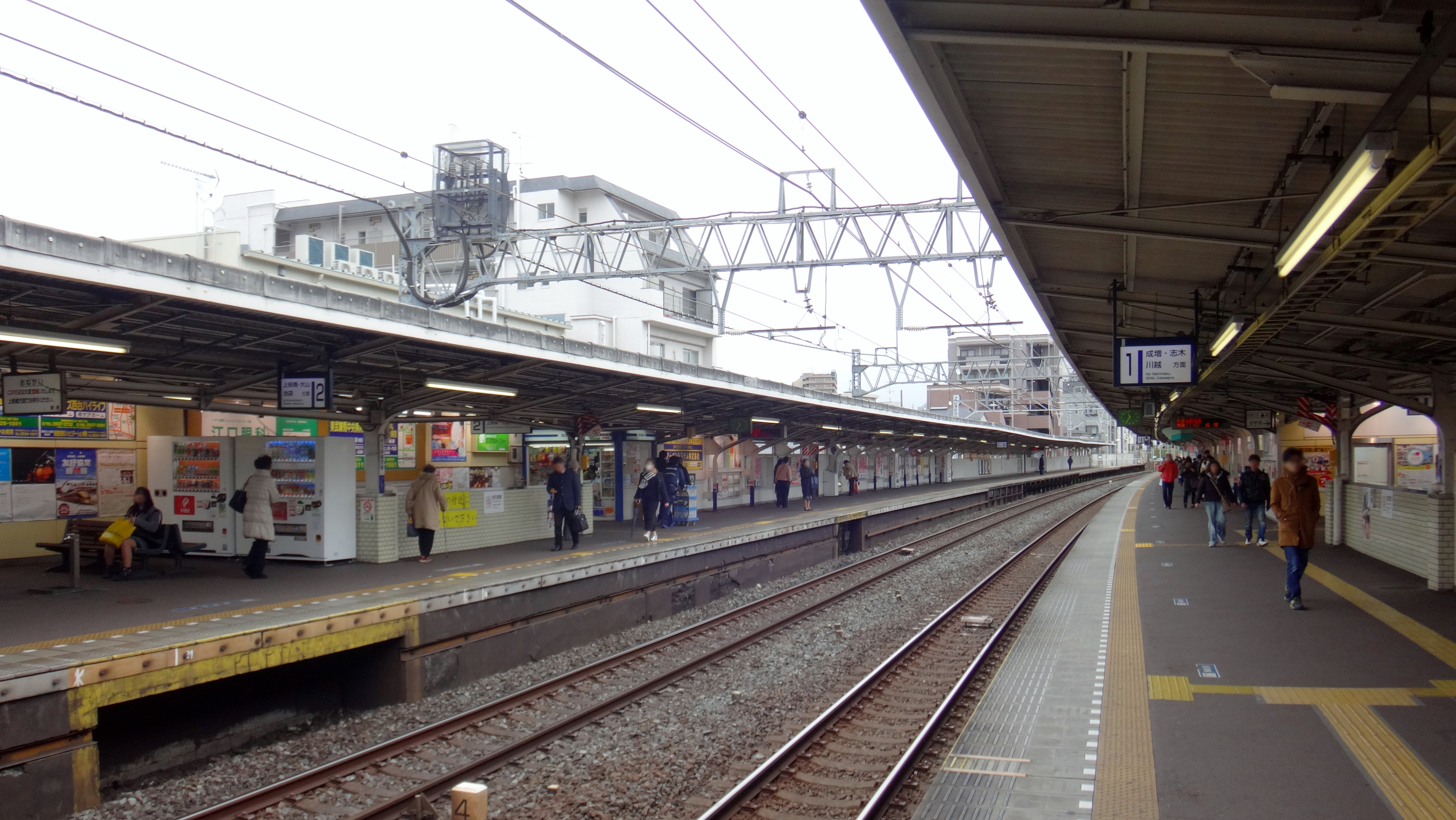
The view from the down end of platform 1 in February 2016

=== Facilities and accessibility ===
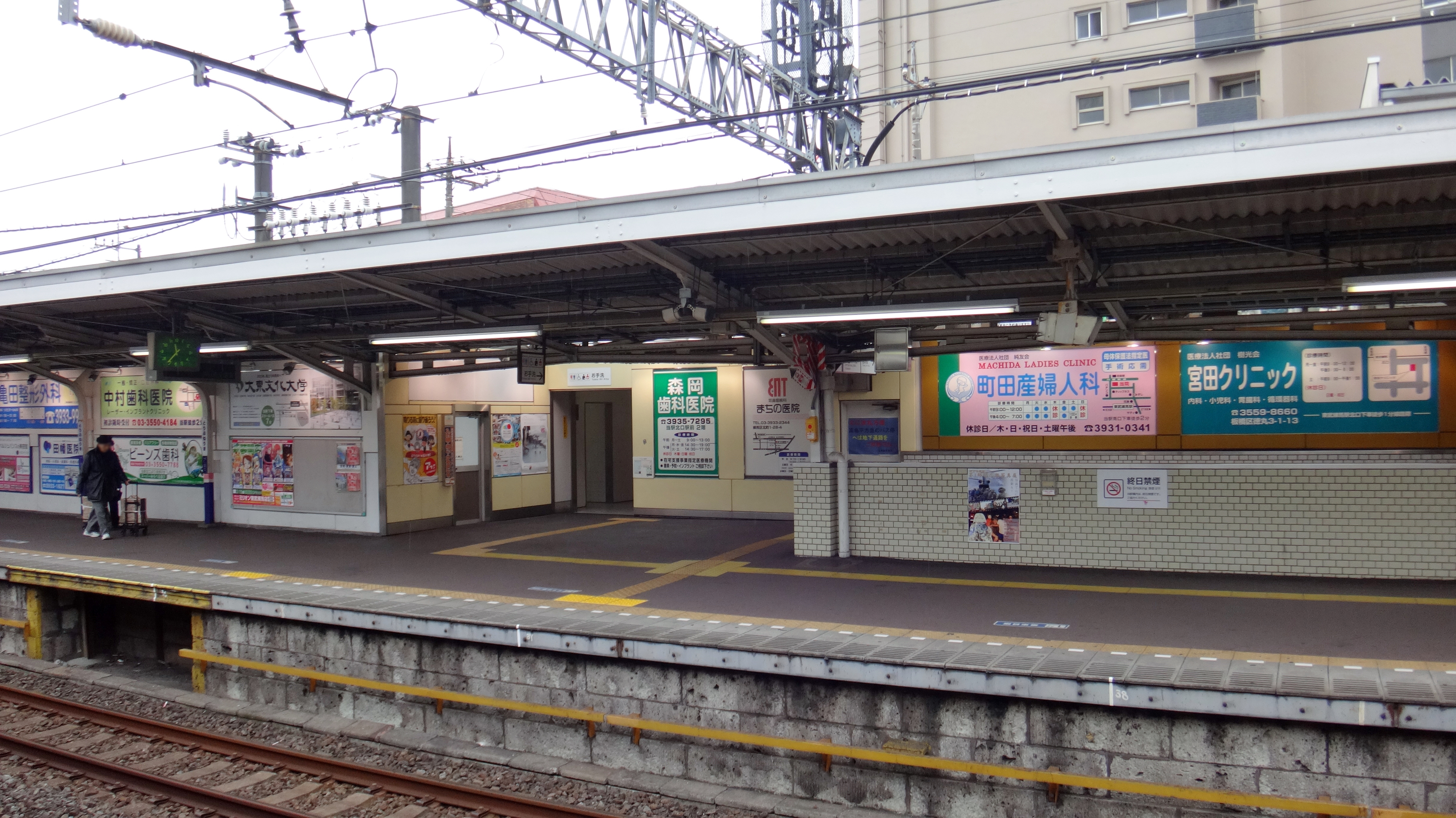
The toilets on platform 1 in February 2016

Toilet facilities are provided on platform 1. Both platforms are wheelchair-accessible from the respective entrances.

== History ==
The station opened on 29 December 1931. At the time of its opening, the station was located in the Tokumaru neighbourhood of the village of Akatsuka, however the station took its name from the town of Nerima immediately to the north of the station, as that was deemed to be better known. The station name was prefixed with the company name "Tobu" to differentiate it from the existing Nerima Station operated by the Musashino Railway (present-day Seibu Railway). The area around the station was absorbed into the City of Tokyo in 1932, all becoming part of Itabashi Ward, and it was not until 1947 that the former town of Nerima was split off from Itabashi Ward to become Nerima Ward.

From 17 March 2012, station numbering was introduced on the Tobu Tojo Line, with Tōbu-Nerima Station becoming "TJ-08".

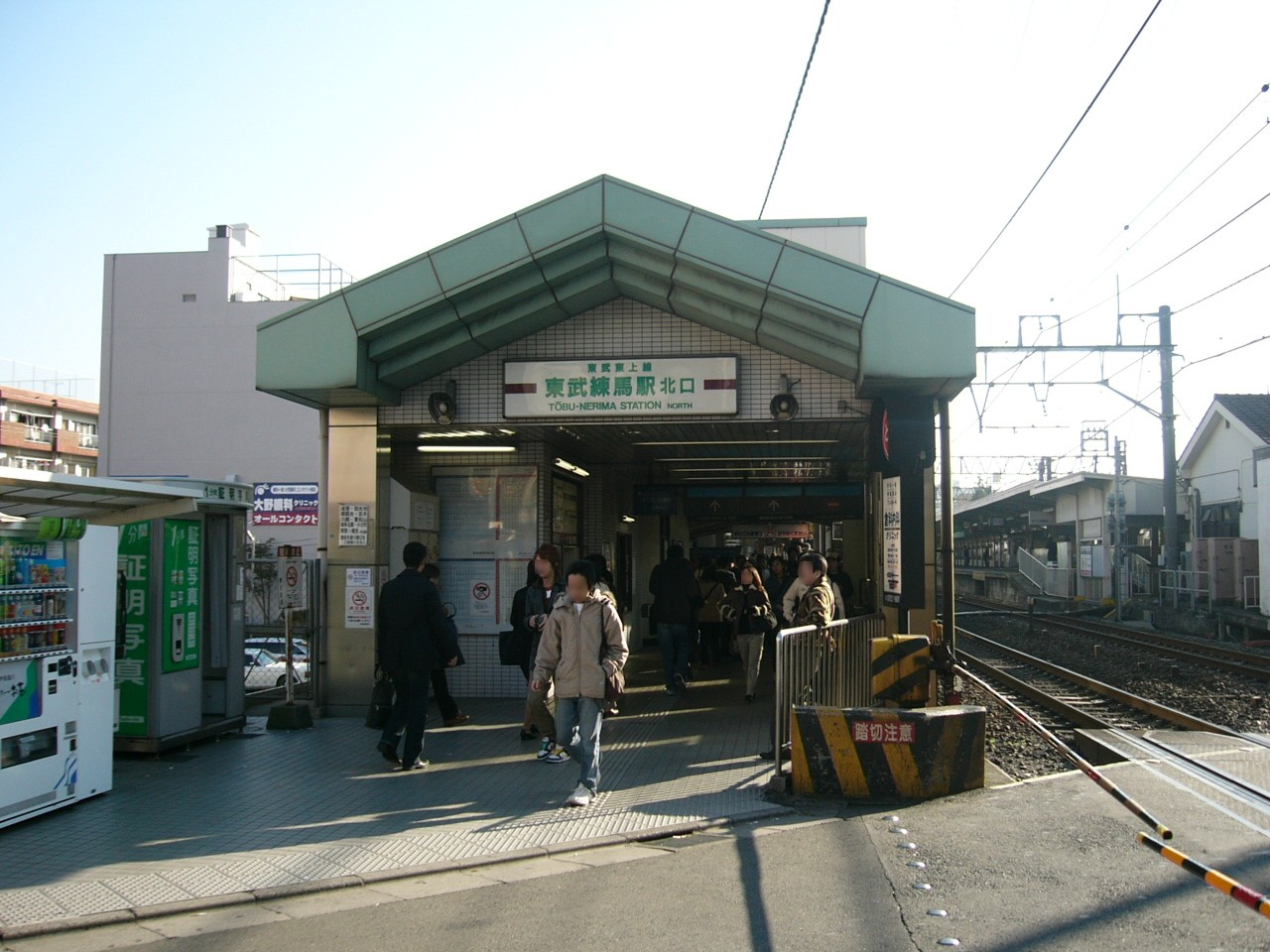
The north entrance in November 2004

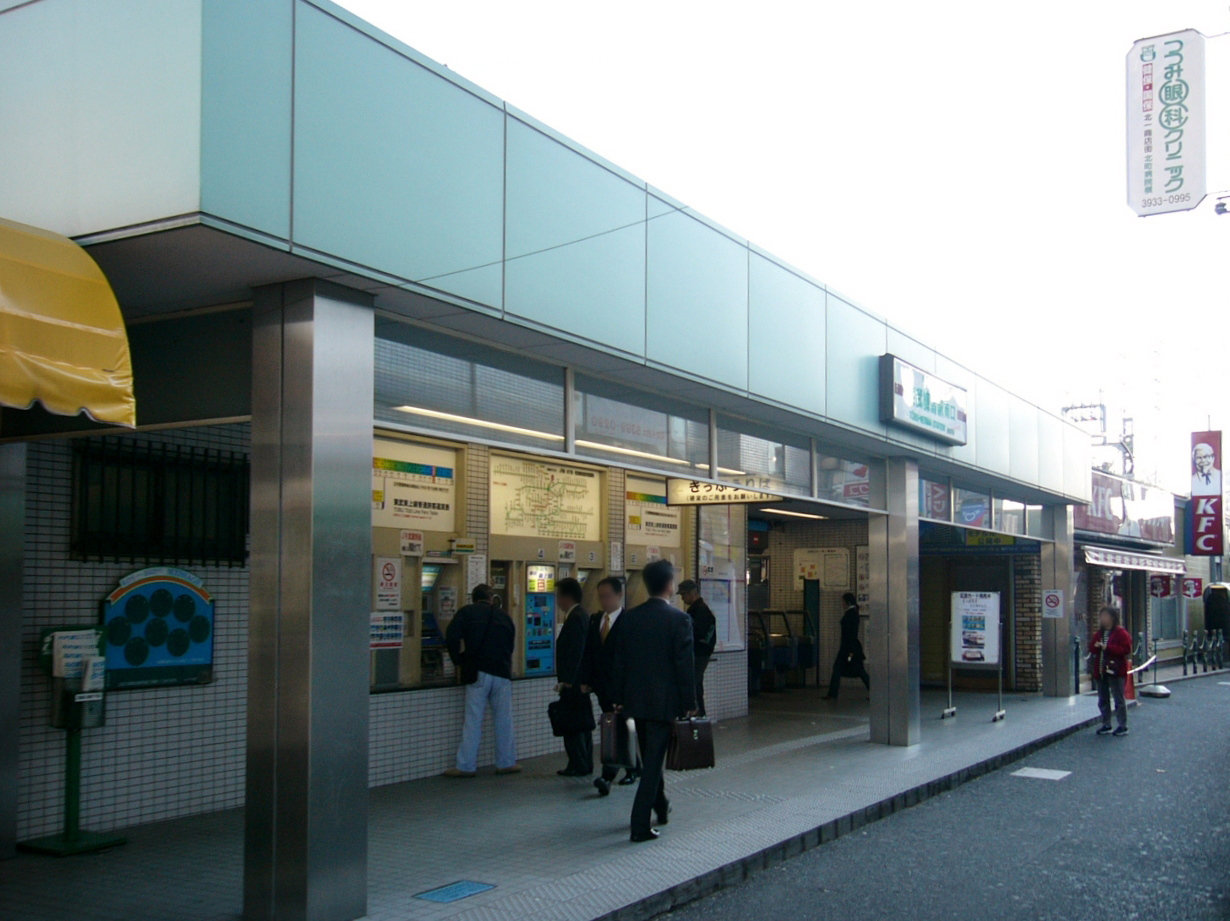
The south entrance in November 2004

== Passenger statistics ==
In fiscal 2014, the station was used by an average of 59,102 passengers daily. The passenger figures for previous years are as shown below.

Fiscal year	Daily average
2010	58,875
2011	58,264
2012	59,495
2013	60,197
2014	59,102

== Surrounding area ==
=== South entrance ===
- JGSDF Camp Nerima

=== North entrance ===
- Tokyo Metropolitan Itabashi Yutoku High School (東京都立板橋有徳高等学校)
- Daito Bunka University
- Daito Bunka University Dai-ichi High School

== See also ==
- List of railway stations in Japan
