= Shimo-Akatsuka Station =

Railway station in Tokyo, Japan

Coordinates: 35.7704°N 139.6443°E

TJ09 Shimo-Akatsuka Station 下赤塚駅
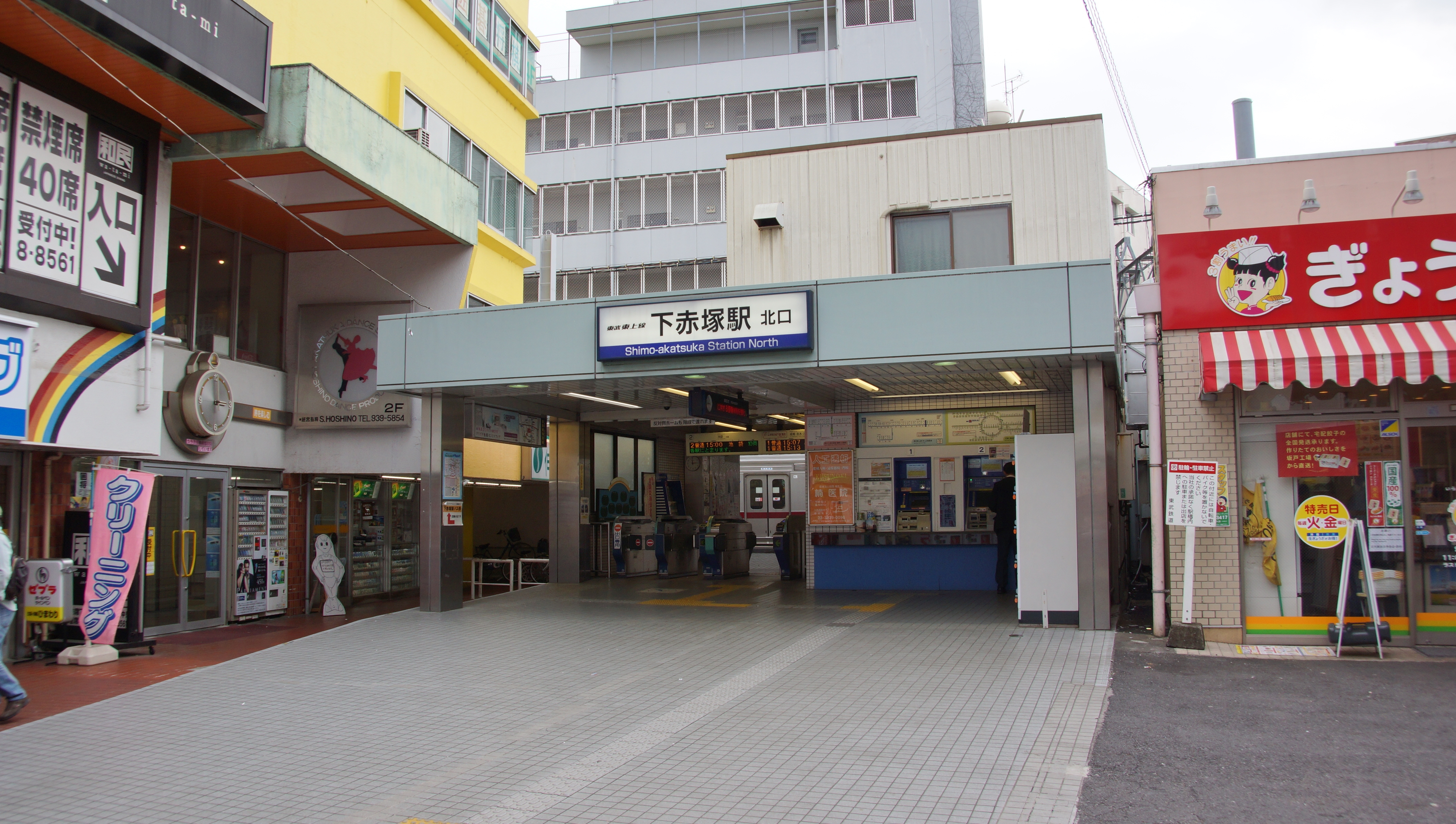
- The north entrance in April 2016

General information
- Location: 1-23-1 Akatsuka-shinmachi, Itabashi-ku, Tokyo 175-0093; Japan
- Operator: Tobu Railway
- Line: Tobu Tojo Line
- Distance: 8.9 km from Ikebukuro
- Platforms: 2 side platforms
- Tracks: 2

Other information
- Station code: TJ-09
- Website: www.tobu.co.jp/station/info/7208.html

History
- Opened: 29 December 1930; 95 years ago

Passengers
- FY2010: 18,457 daily

Services
Preceding station	Tobu Railway	Following station
Narimasu TJ10 towards Yorii	Tojo Line Local	Tōbu-Nerima TJ08 towards Ikebukuro
Location
- Location within Japan

Shimo-Akatsuka Station (下赤塚駅, Shimo-akatsuka-eki) is a railway station on the Tobu Tojo Line in Itabashi, Tokyo, Japan, operated by the private railway operator Tobu Railway.

== Lines ==
Shimo-Akatsuka Station is served by the Tobu Tojo Line from Ikebukuro in Tokyo. Located between Tōbu-Nerima and Narimasu, it is 8.9 km from the Ikebukuro terminus. Only "Local" (all-stations) services stop at this station, with eight trains per hour in each direction during the daytime.

== Station layout ==
The station consists of two side platforms serving two tracks. The station has two entrances: the north entrance adjoining platform 2 (for Ikebukuro) and the south entrance adjoining platform 1 (for Narimasu). The two platforms are also linked by an underpass.

=== Platforms ===
1	Tobu Tojo Line	for Narimasu and Shiki
2	Tobu Tojo Line	for Kami-Itabashi and Ikebukuro

=== Facilities ===
Passenger toilet facilities are provided on platform 1.

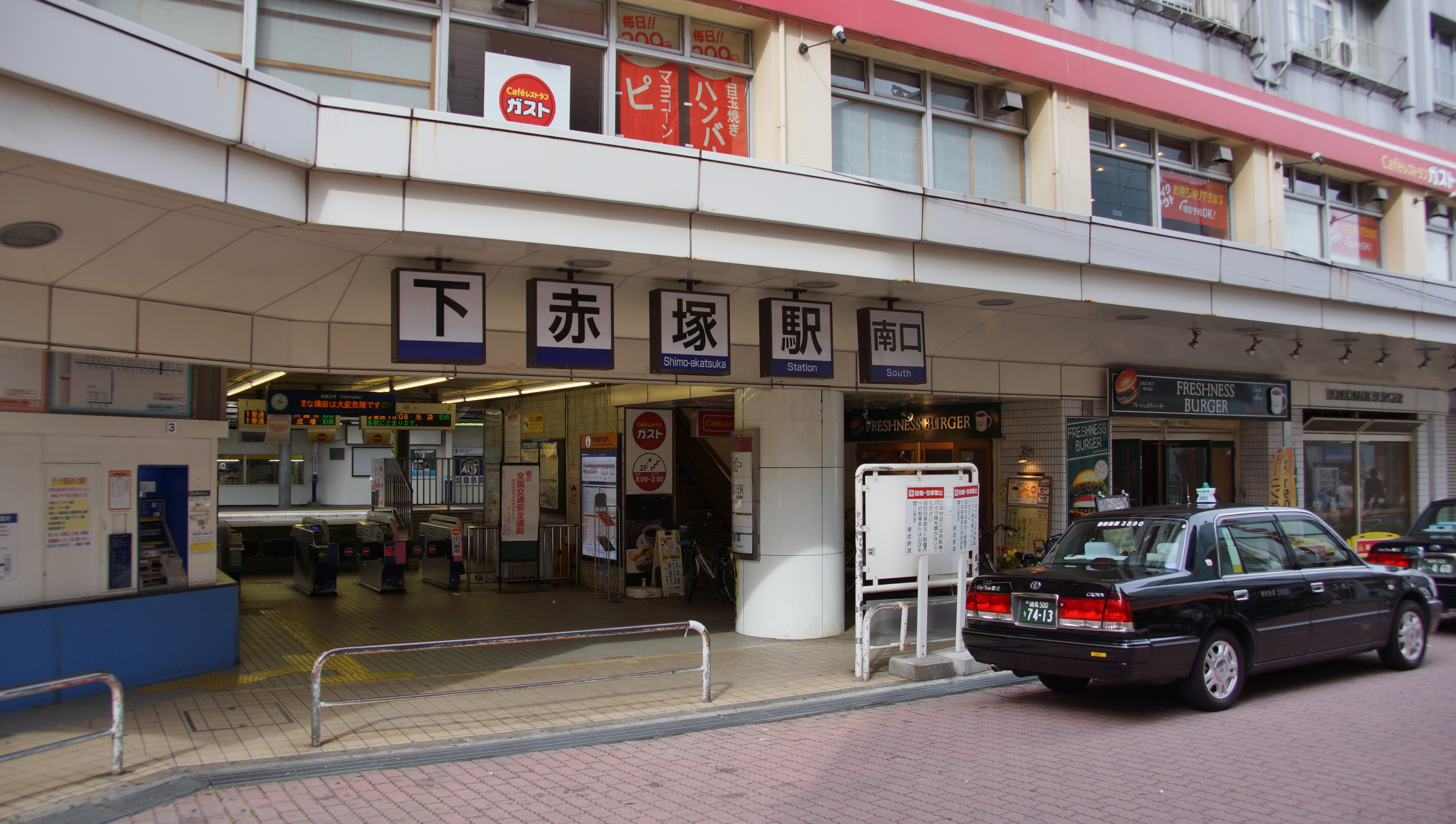
The south entrance in April 2016

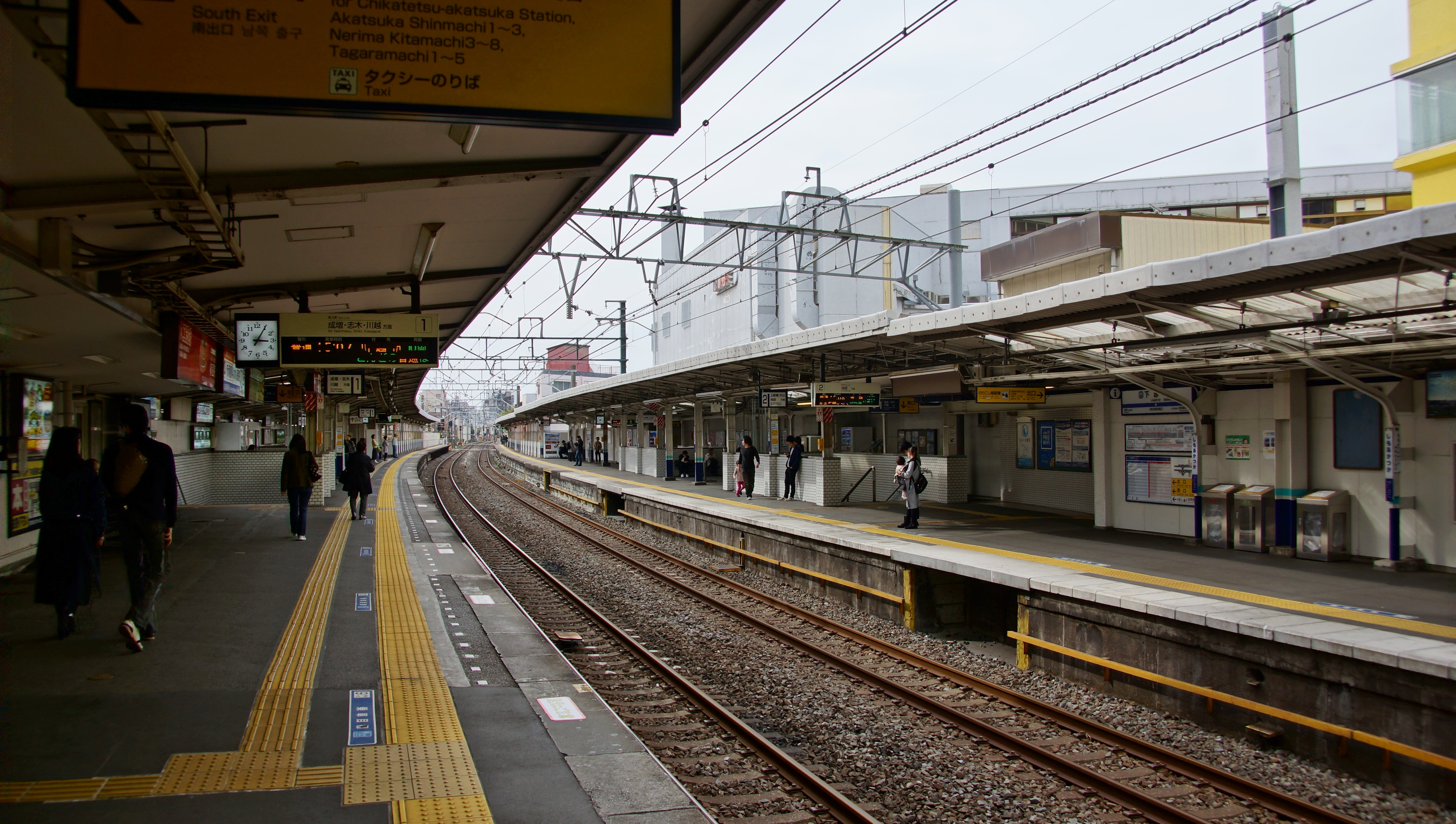
The up (Ikebukuro) end of platform 1 in April 2016

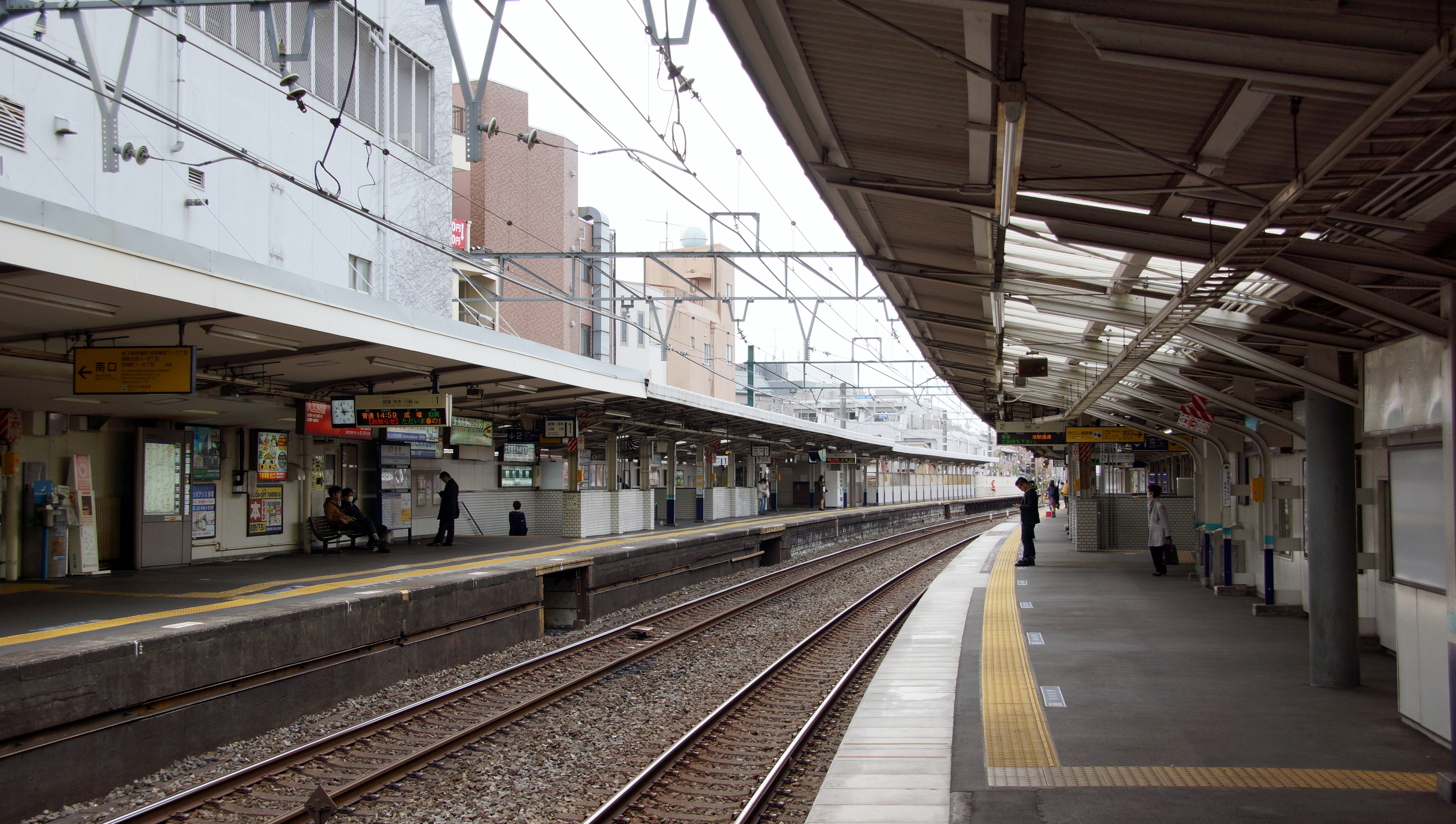
The up (Ikebukuro) end of platform 2 in April 2016

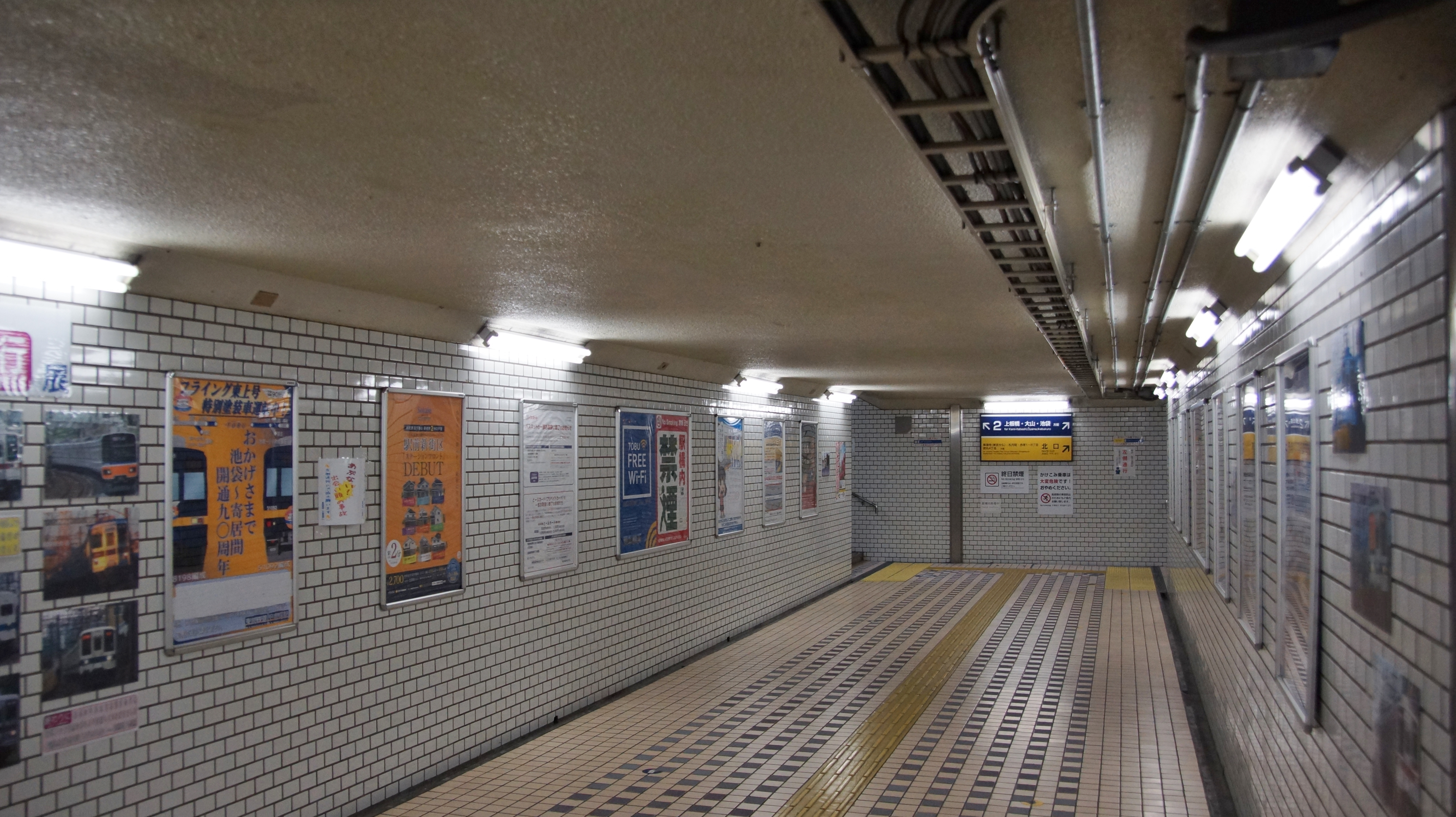
The underpass linking the two platforms

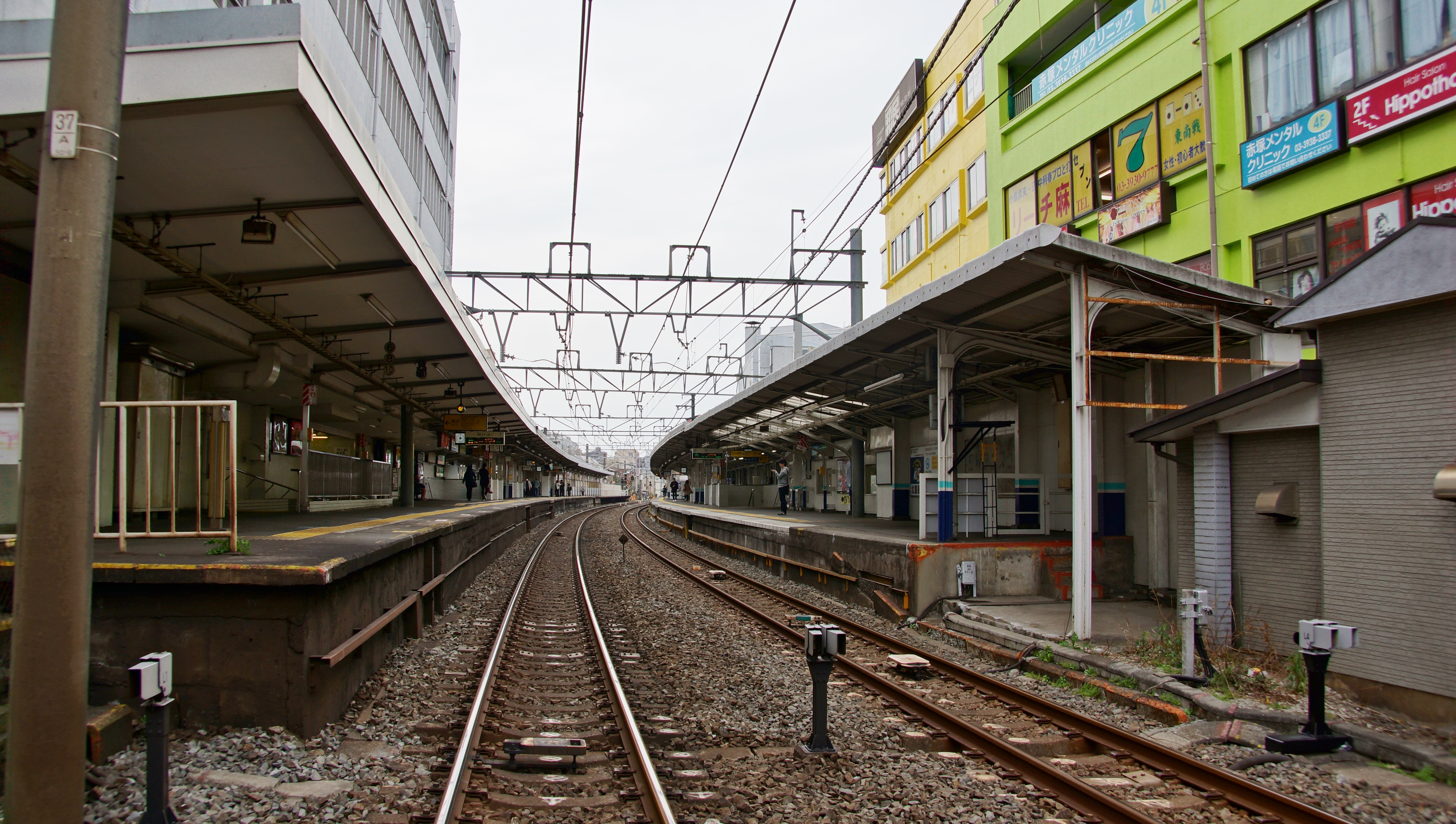
The platforms viewed from the east (Ikebukuro) end in April 2016

== History ==
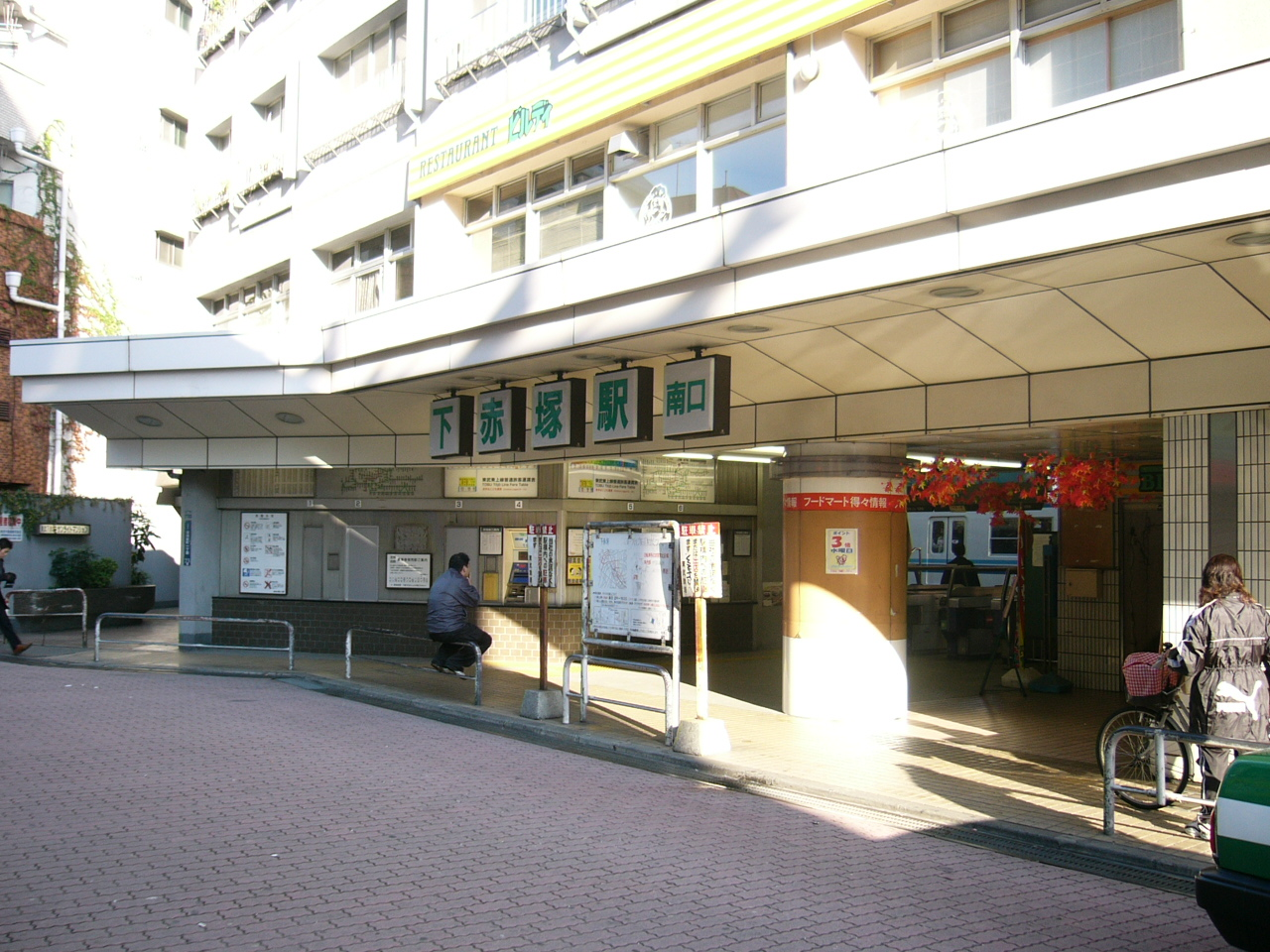
The south entrance in November 2004

The station opened on 29 December 1930.

From 17 March 2012, station numbering was introduced on the Tobu Tojo Line, with Shimo-Akatsuka Station becoming "TJ-09".

== Passenger statistics ==
In fiscal 2010, the station was used by an average of 18,457 passengers daily.

== Surrounding area ==
- Chikatetsu-Akatsuka Station ( Tokyo Metro Yūrakuchō Line/ Tokyo Metro Fukutoshin Line)
- Hikarigaoka Park
- Akatsuka Park
- Itabashi Art Museum
- National Route 254

== See also ==
- List of railway stations in Japan
