= Yanasegawa Station =

Railway station in Shiki, Saitama Prefecture, Japan

TJ15 Yanasegawa Station 柳瀬川駅
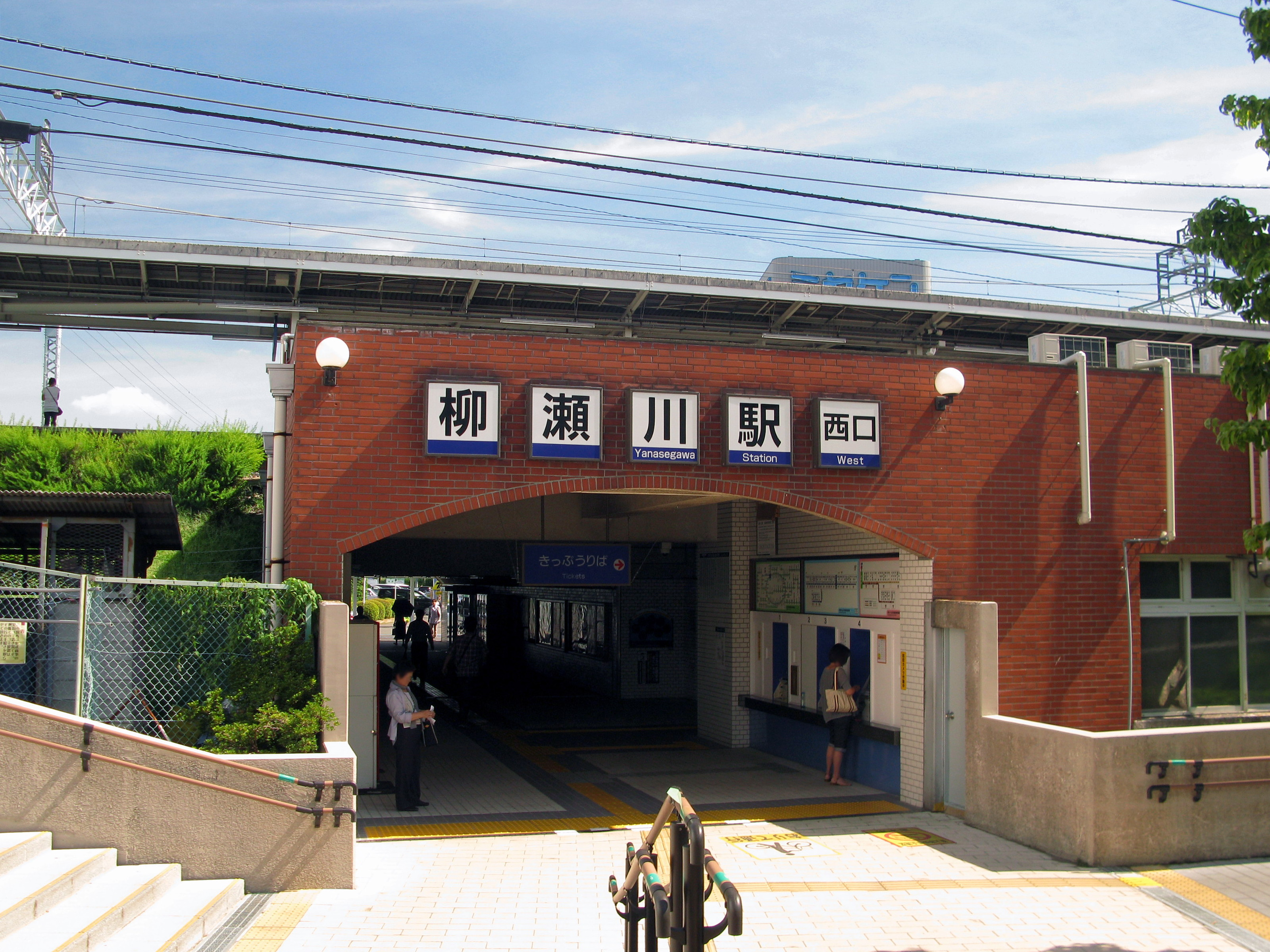
- The west entrance in September 2012

General information
- Location: 2-5-1 Tate, Shiki-shi, Saitama-ken 353-0006; Japan
- Coordinates: 35.8312°N 139.5628°E
- Operator: Tōbu Railway
- Line: Tōbu Tōjō Line
- Distance: 19.3 km from Ikebukuro
- Platforms: 1 island platform
- Tracks: 2
- Connections: Bus stop

Other information
- Station code: TJ-15
- Website: Official website

History
- Opened: 8 November 1979

Passengers
- FY2019: 20,264 daily

Services
Preceding station	Tobu Railway	Following station
Mizuhodai TJ16 towards Yorii	Tojo Line Semi Express Local	Shiki TJ14 towards Ikebukuro
Location
- Location within Saitama Prefecture Location within Japan

Yanasegawa Station (柳瀬川駅, Yanasegawa-eki) is a passenger railway station located in the city of Shiki, Saitama, Japan, operated by the private railway operator Tōbu Railway.

== Lines ==
Yanasegawa station is served by the Tōbu Tōjō Line from Ikebukuro in Tokyo, with some services inter-running via the Tokyo Metro Yurakucho Line to Shin-Kiba and the Tokyo Metro Fukutoshin Line to Shibuya and onward via the Tokyu Toyoko Line and Minato Mirai Line to Motomachi-Chukagai. Located between Shiki and Mizuhodai stations, it is 19.3 km from the Ikebukuro terminus. Only Semi express and Local services stop at this station.

== Station layout ==
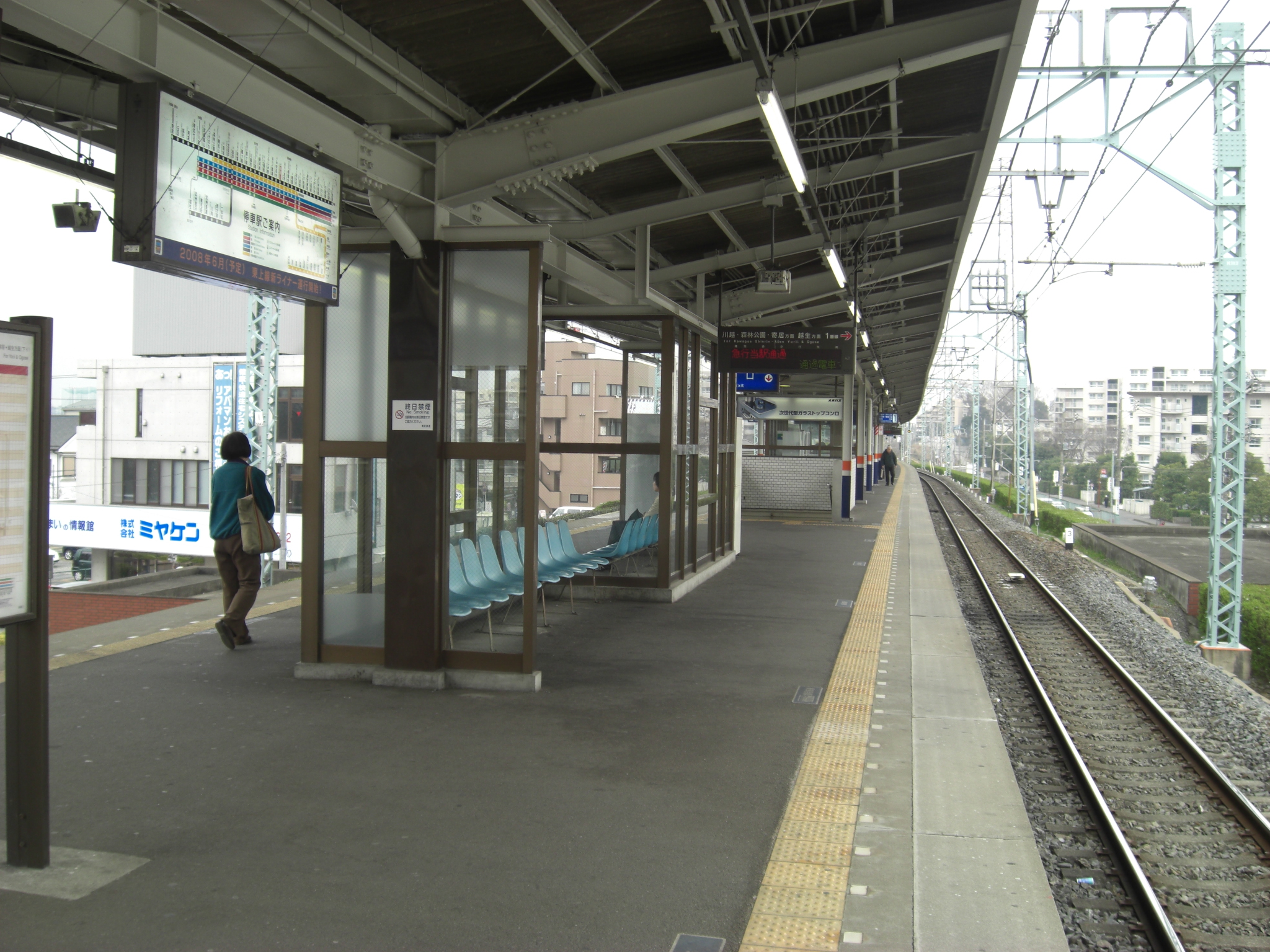
The platforms in March 2008

The station consists of a single elevated island platform serving two tracks, with the station building located underneath.

=== Platforms ===
1	■ Tōbu Tōjō Line	for Fujimino, Kawagoe, Shinrinkōen, Ogawamachi, and Yorii
2	■ Tōbu Tōjō Line	for Shiki, Wakōshi, Narimasu, and Ikebukuro; Tokyo Metro Yurakucho Line for Shin-Kiba; Tokyo Metro Fukutoshin Line for Shibuya; Tōkyū Tōyoko Line for Hiyoshi and Yokohama; Tōkyū Shin-Yokohama Line for Shin-Yokohama via Sōtetsu Shin-Yokohama Line for Shōnandai; Minatomirai Line for Motomachi-Chukagai

== History ==
The station opened on 8 November 1979.

Through-running to and from Shibuya via the Tokyo Metro Fukutoshin Line commenced on 14 June 2008.

From 17 March 2012, station numbering was introduced on the Tobu Tojo Line, with Yanasegawa Station becoming "TJ-15".

Through-running to and from Yokohama and Motomachi-Chukagai via the Tokyu Toyoko Line and Minatomirai Line commenced on 16 March 2013.

Through service via the Tōkyū Shin-yokohama Line, Sōtetsu Shin-yokohama Line, Sōtetsu Main Line, and Sōtetsu Izumino Line to Shin-Yokohama and Shōnandai commenced on 18 March 2023.

== Passenger statistics ==
In fiscal 2019, the station was used by an average of 20,264 passengers daily.

== Accidents ==
On 3 September 2012 at around 22:10, a woman in her fifties jumped from the platform into the path of a non-stop Ikebukuro-bound express service and was killed.

== Surrounding area ==
- Shiki New Town
- Yanasegawa River
- Atomi University
- National Route 463

== See also ==
- List of railway stations in Japan
