= Narimasu Station =

Railway station in Tokyo, Japan

Coordinates: 35.7773°N 139.6326°E

TJ10 Narimasu Station 成増駅
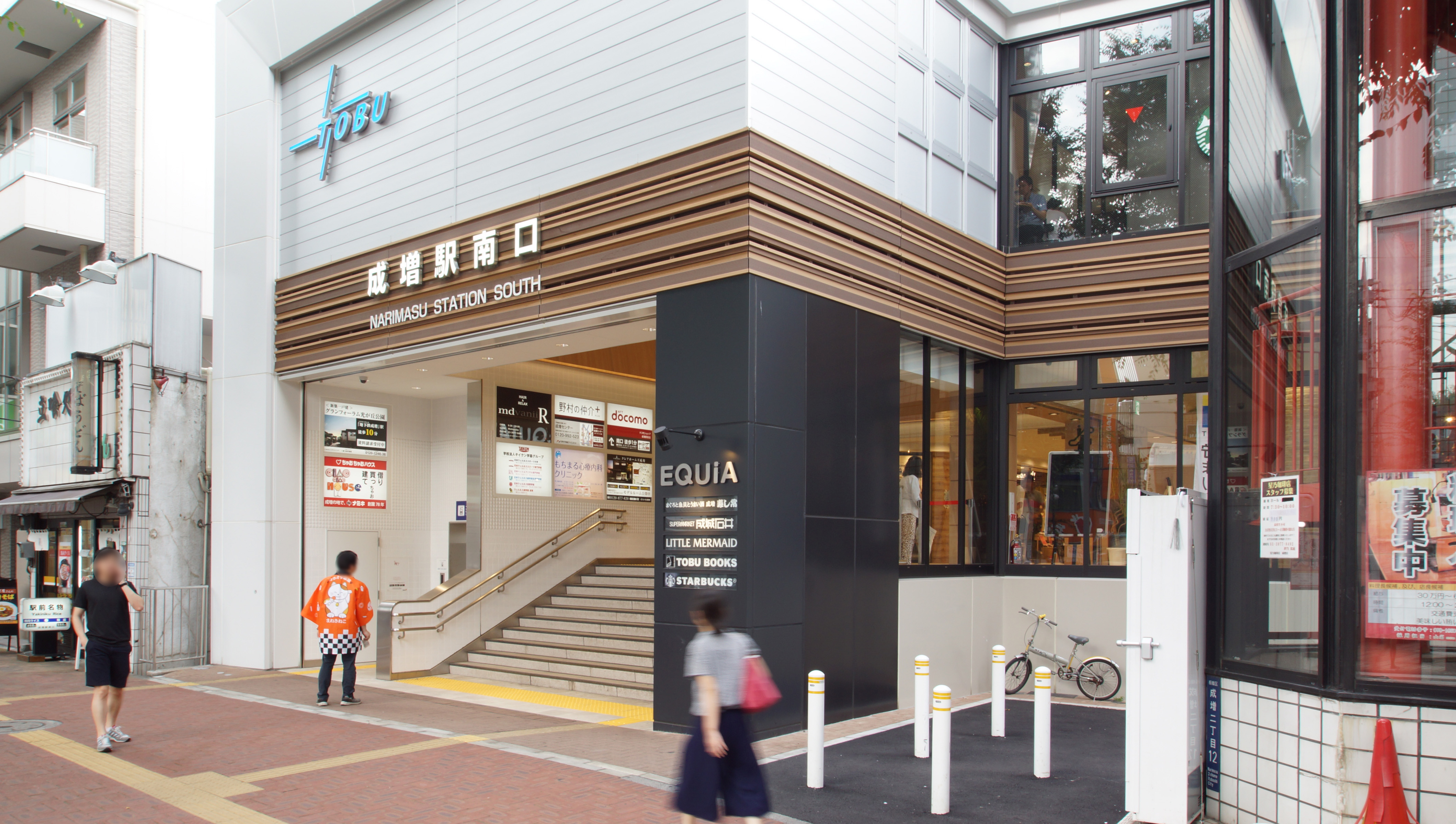
- The south entrance in July 2016

General information
- Location: 2-13-1 Narimasu, Itabashi-ku, Tokyo 175-0094; Japan
- Operator: Tobu Railway
- Line: Tobu Tojo Line
- Distance: 10.4 km from Ikebukuro
- Platforms: 2 island platforms
- Tracks: 4
- Connections: Bus terminal

Other information
- Station code: TJ-10
- Website: www.tobu.co.jp/station/info/7209.html

History
- Opened: 1 May 1914; 112 years ago

Passengers
- FY2014: 57,729 daily

Services
Preceding station	Tobu Railway	Following station
Wakōshi TJ11 towards Yorii	Tojo Line Express	Ikebukuro TJ01 Terminus
Wakōshi TJ11 towards Yorii	Tojo Line Semi Express	Kami-Itabashi TJ07 towards Ikebukuro
Wakōshi TJ11 towards Yorii	Tojo Line Local	Shimo-Akatsuka TJ09 towards Ikebukuro
Location
- Location within Japan

Narimasu Station (成増駅, Narimasu-eki) is a railway station on the Tobu Tojo Line in Itabashi, Tokyo, Japan, operated by the private railway operator Tobu Railway.

== Lines ==
The station is served by the Tobu Tojo Line from Ikebukuro in Tokyo. Located between Shimo-Akatsuka and Wakōshi, it is 10.4 km (6.5 mi) from the Ikebukuro terminus. Express, Semi Express, and Local services stop at this station. During midday, six of the eight Local trains per hour terminate here, with the other two continuing to Kawagoeshi.

== Station layout ==
The station consists of two island platforms serving four tracks. Platforms 2 and 4 are used to allow faster trains to overtake slower stopping trains. This station has a commuter pass sales office.

=== Platforms ===
1/2	Tobu Tojo Line	for Shiki, Kawagoe, Shinrinkōen, Ogawamachi, and Yorii
3/4	Tobu Tojo Line	for Kami-Itabashi, Ōyama, and Ikebukuro

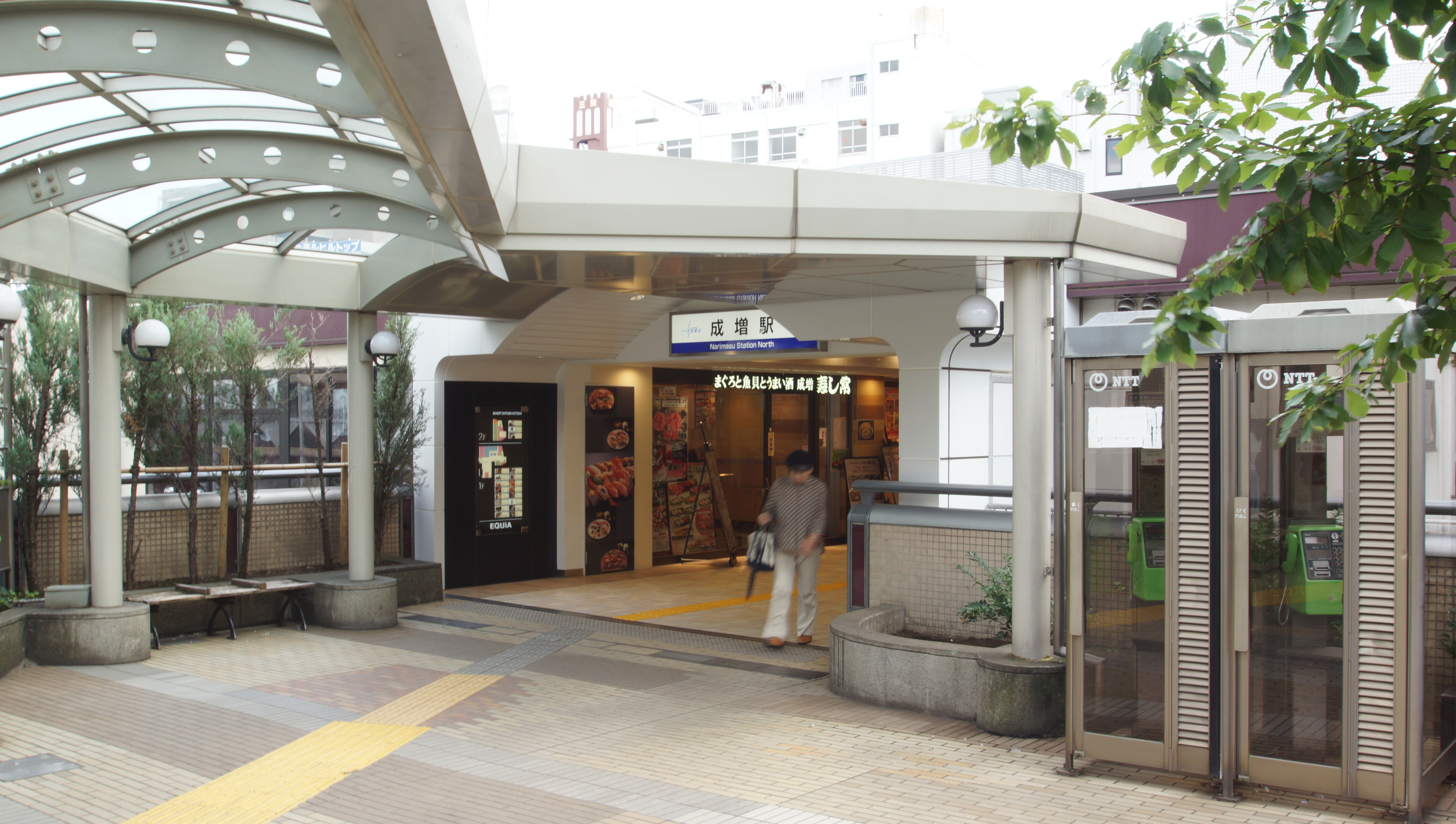
The north entrance in July 2016

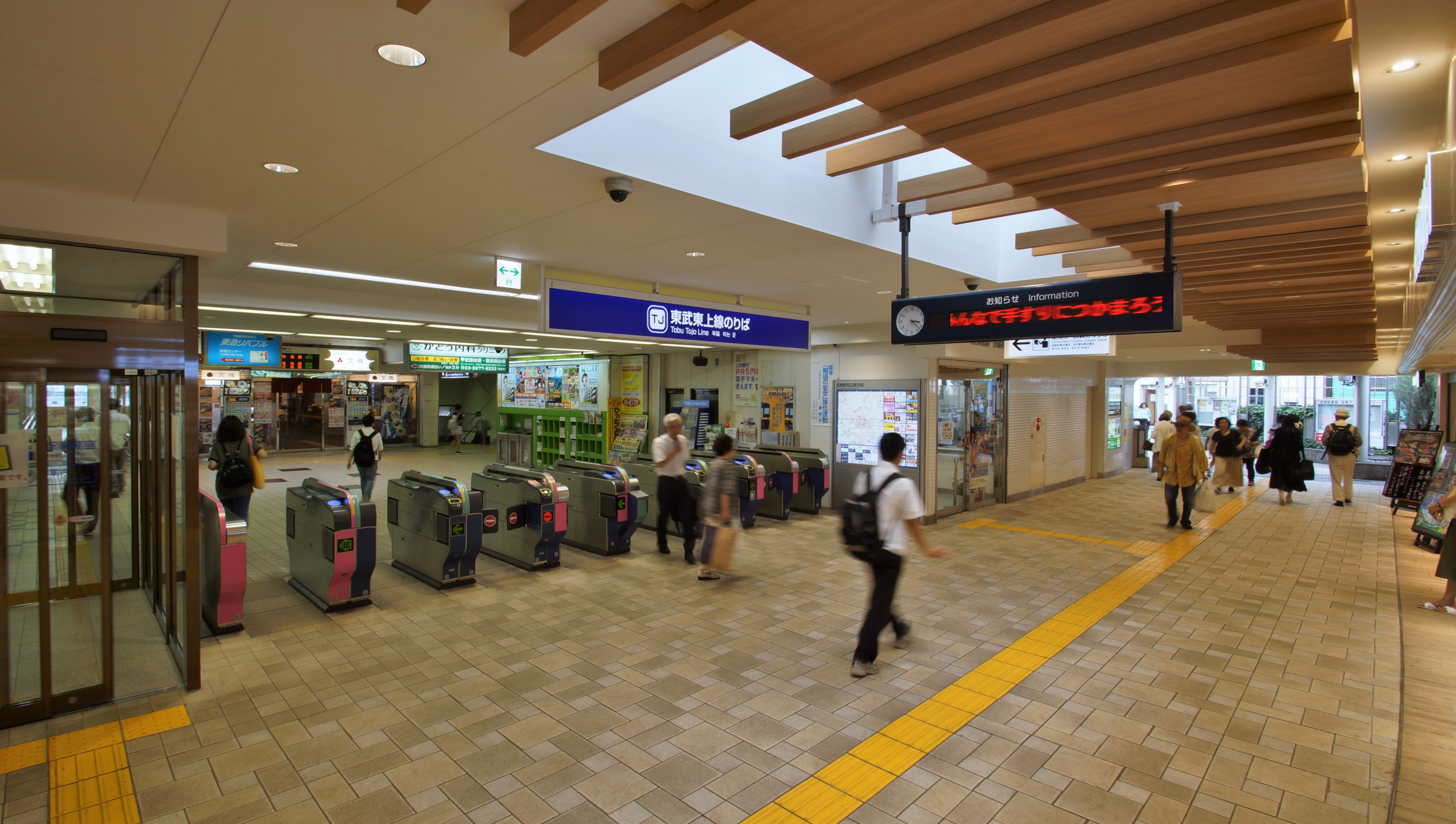
The ticket barriers in July 2016

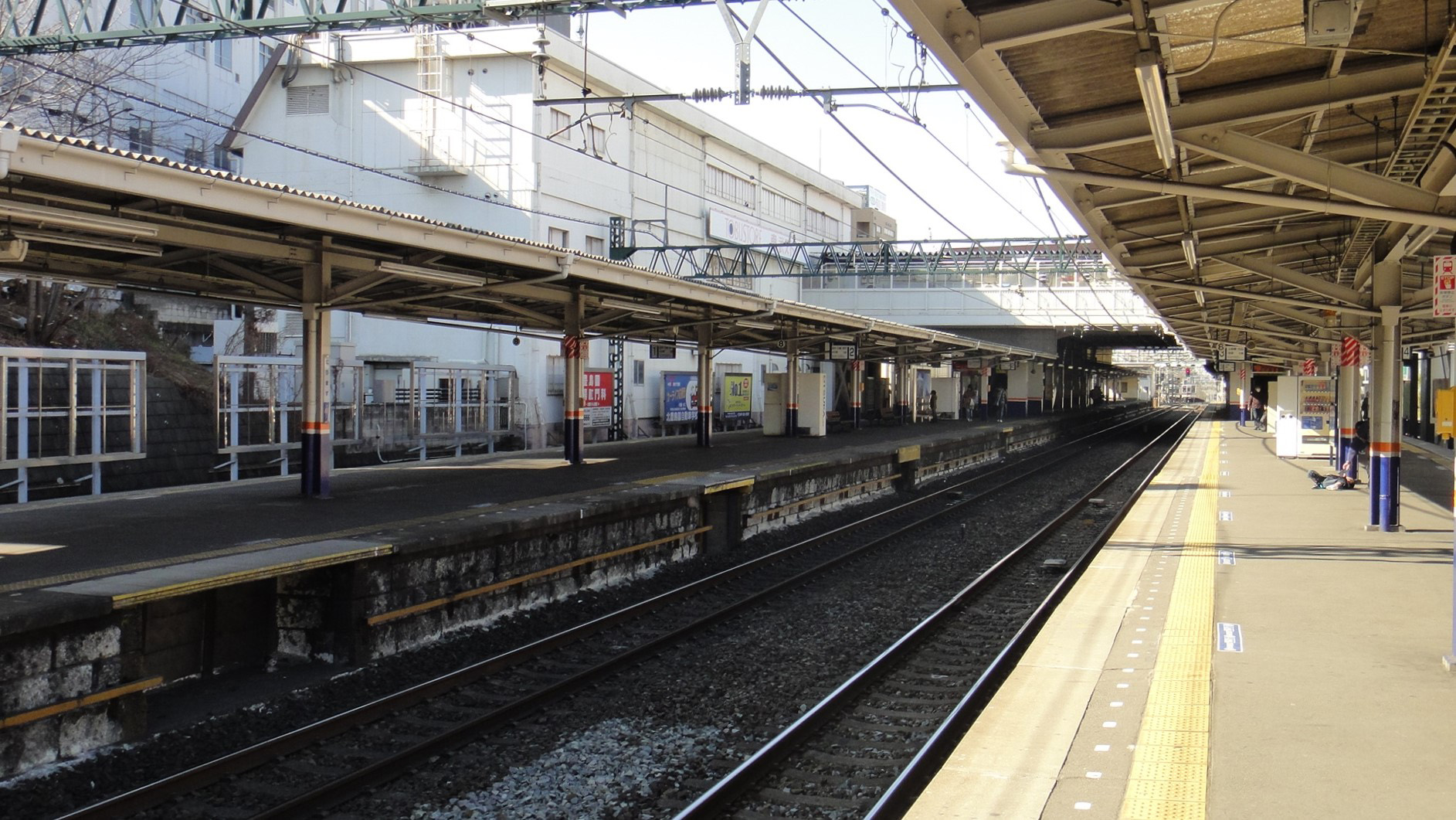
The platforms viewed from the up end in February 2012

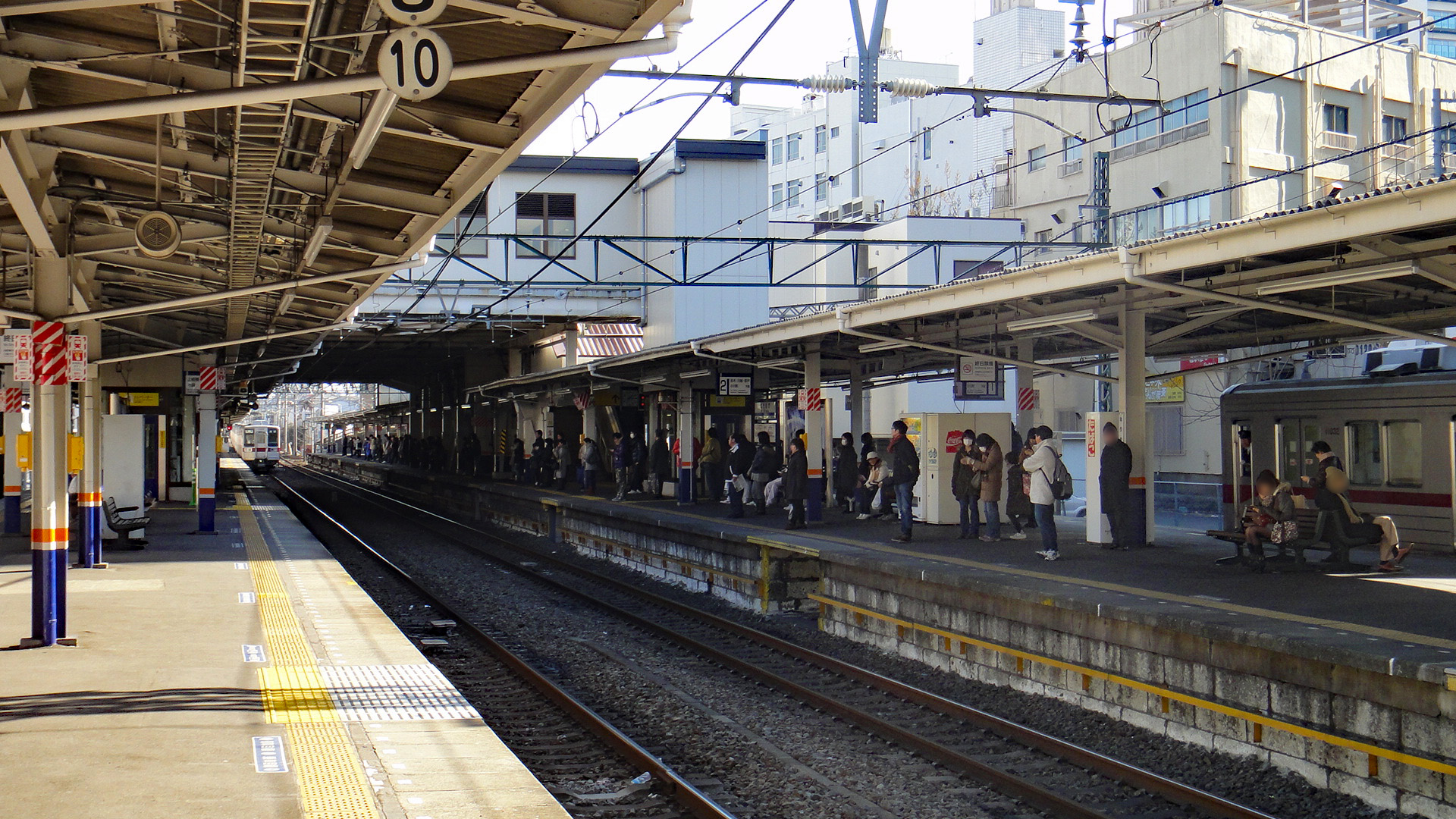
The platforms viewed from the down end in February 2012

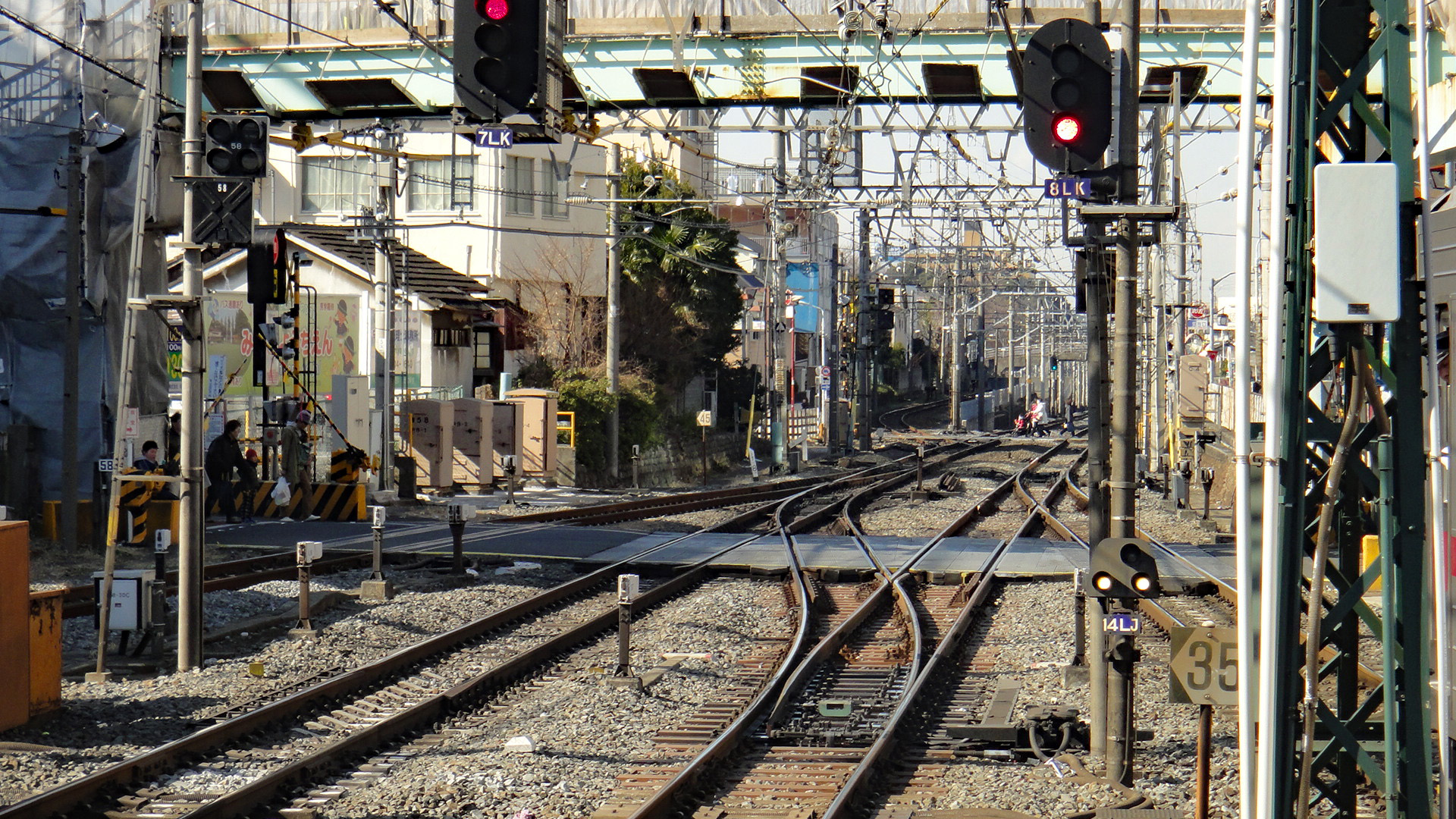
The view from the down end of the platforms in February 2012, with the turn-back siding for terminating trains visible to the left of the main running tracks

== History ==
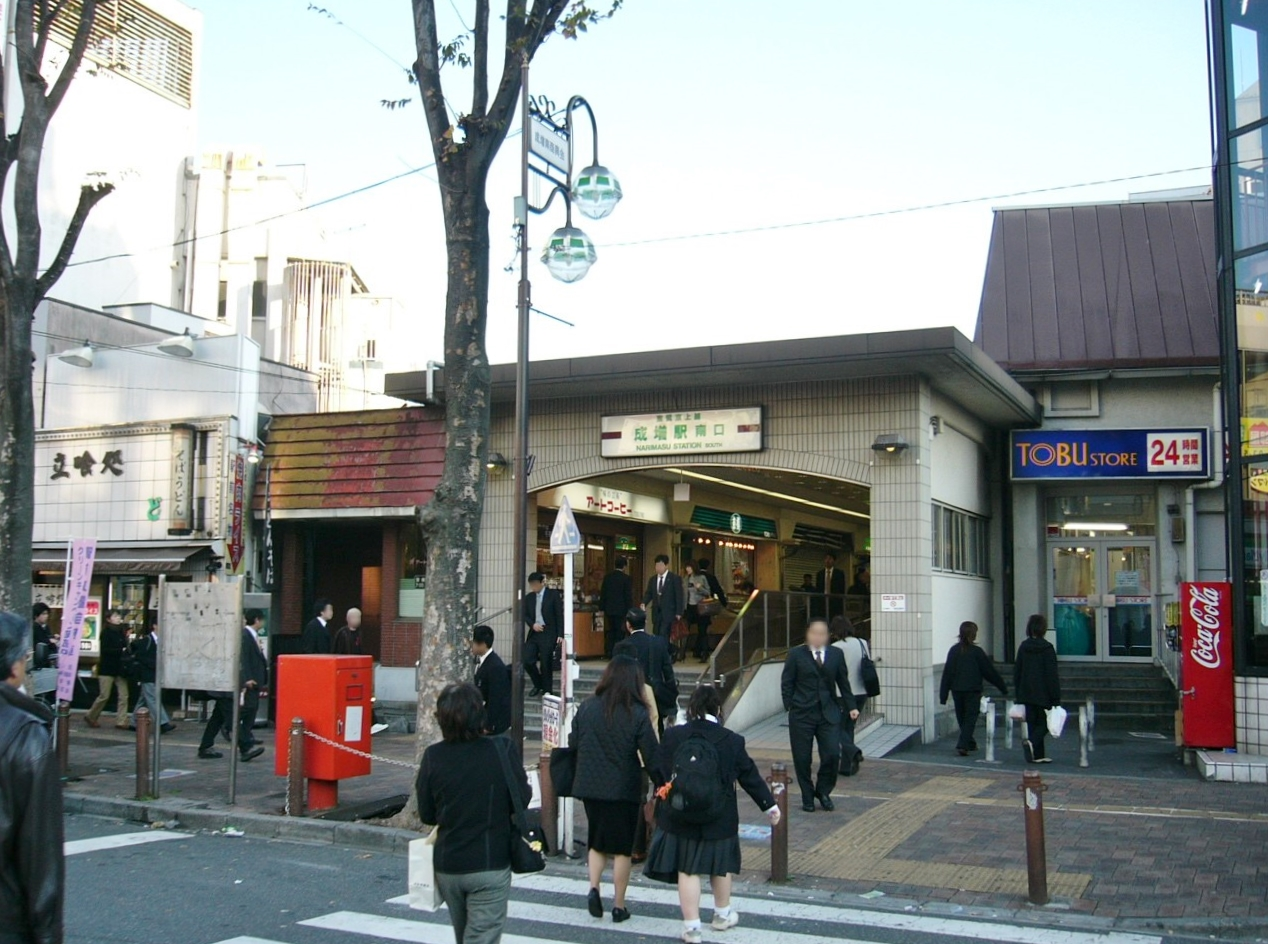
The south entrance in 2004

The station opened on 1 May 1914 coinciding with the opening of the Tojo Railway line from Ikebukuro.

From 17 March 2012, station numbering was introduced on the Tobu Tojo Line, with Narimasu Station becoming "TJ-10".

== Passenger statistics ==
In fiscal 2014, the station was used by an average of 57,729 passengers daily. Passenger figures for previous years (boarding passengers only) are as shown below.

Fiscal year	Daily average
1950	6,724 (Note: Number of boarding passengers only)
1960	14,506
1970	34,416
1980	40,076
1990	37,067
2000	41,985
2010	37,548
2014	57,729

== Surrounding area ==
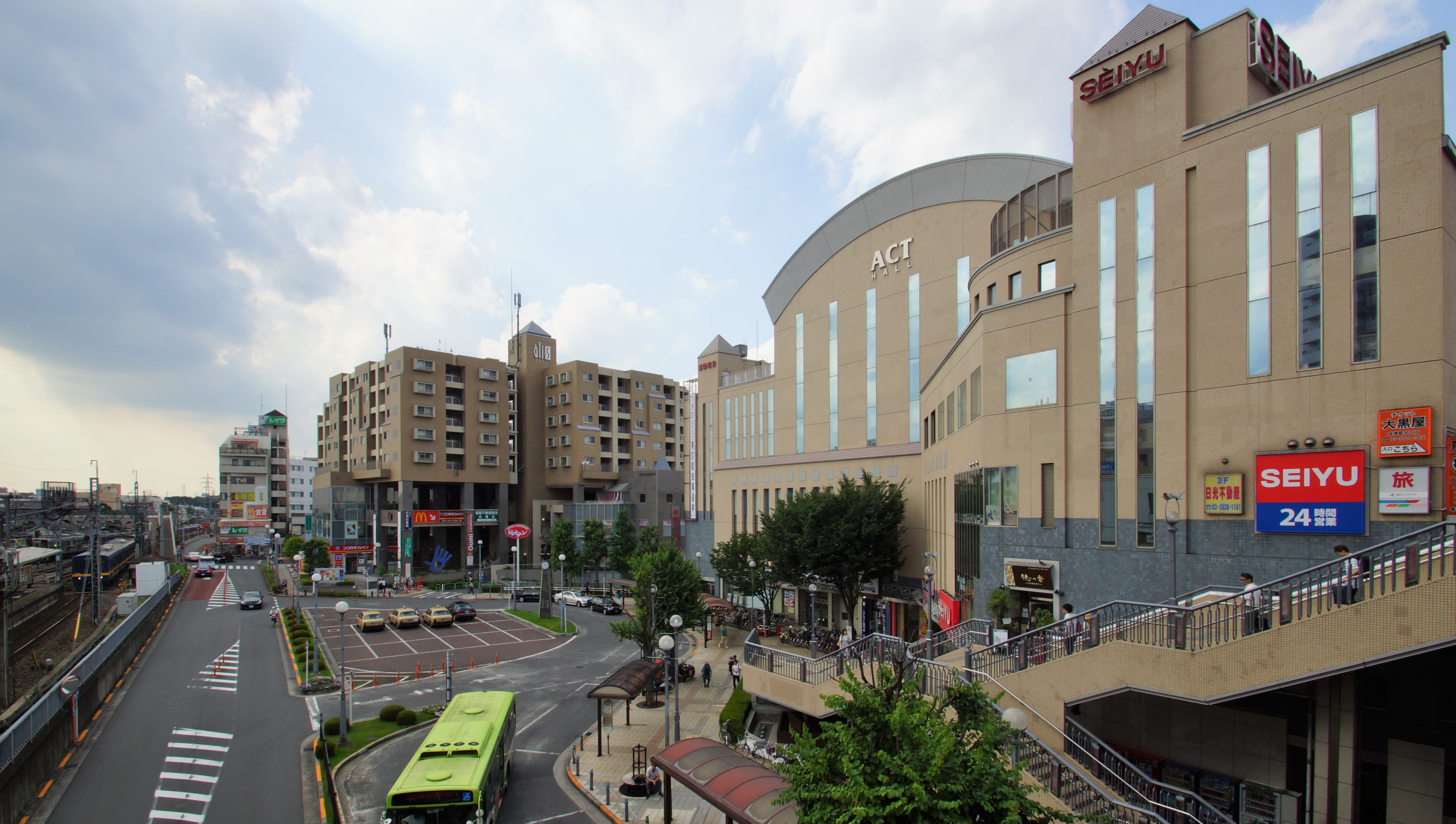
The north side of the station in July 2016

=== North side ===
- Narimasu Library
- Itabashi Art Museum
- Akatsuka No. 2 Junior High School
- Akatsuka Elementary School
- Akatsuka Park

=== South side ===
- Chikatetsu-Narimasu Station (on the Tokyo Metro Yurakucho Line and Tokyo Metro Fukutoshin Line)
- Hokei Junior High School
- Narimasu Elementary School
- Hikarigaoka Park

== See also ==
- List of railway stations in Japan
