= Shiki Station (Saitama) =

Railway station in Niiza, Saitama Prefecture, Japan

TJ14 Shiki Station 志木駅
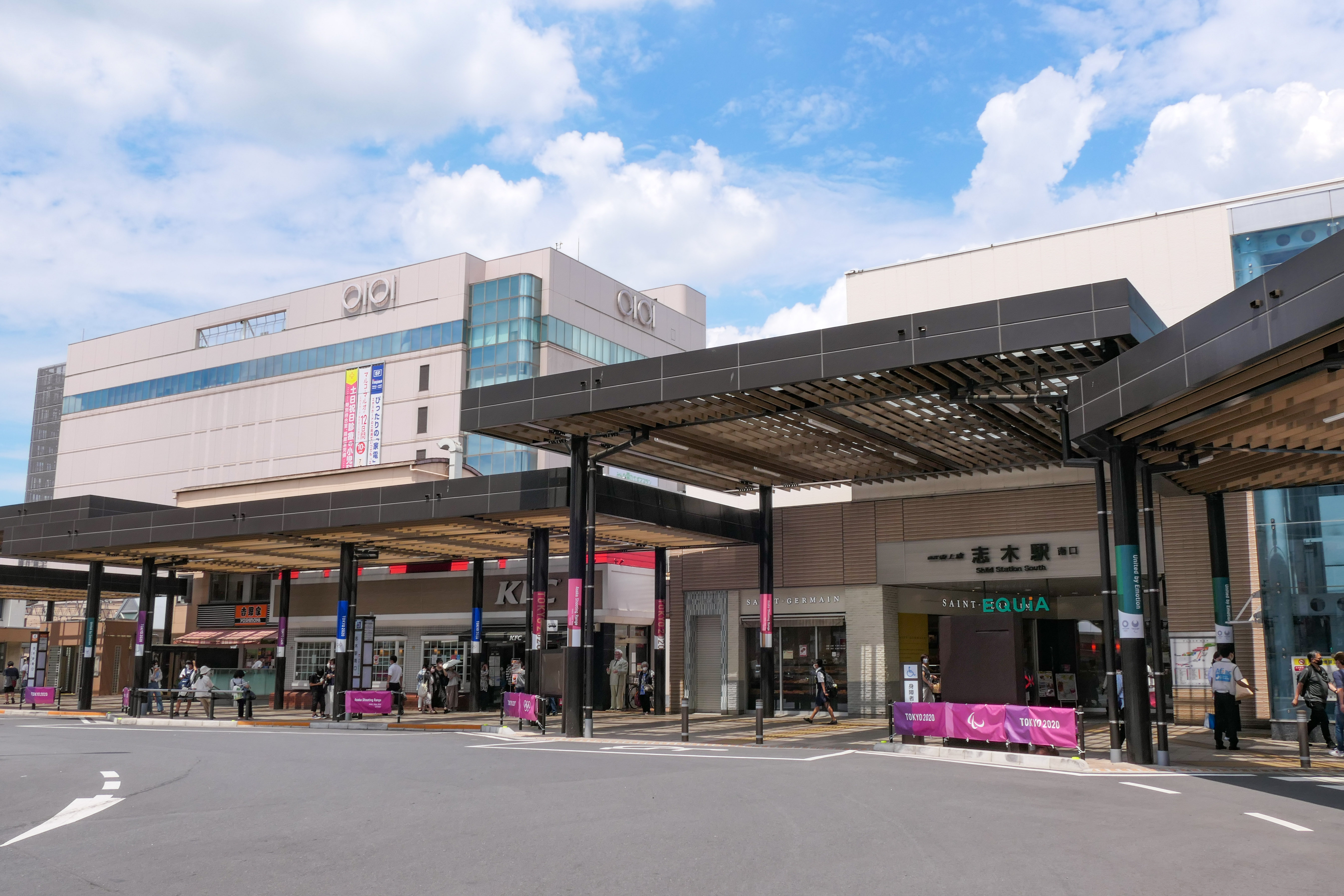
- The south entrance in July 2021

General information
- Location: 2-38-1 Tōhoku, Niiza-shi, Saitama-ken 352-0001; Japan
- Coordinates: 35.822346°N 139.575237°E
- Operator: Tōbu Railway
- Line: Tōbu Tōjō Line
- Distance: 17.8 km from Ikebukuro
- Platforms: 2 island platforms
- Tracks: 4
- Connections: Bus terminal

Other information
- Station code: TJ-14
- Website: Official website

History
- Opened: 1 May 1914
- Rebuilt: 1970

Passengers
- FY2019: 104,698 daily

Services
Preceding station	Tobu Railway	Following station
Fujimino TJ18 towards Yorii	Tojo Line Express	Asakadai TJ13 towards Ikebukuro
Yanasegawa TJ15 towards Yorii	Tojo Line Semi Express Local	Asakadai TJ13 towards Ikebukuro
Location
- Location within Saitama Prefecture Location within Japan

Shiki Station (志木駅, Shiki-eki) is a passenger railway station located in the city of Niiza, Saitama, Japan, operated by the private railway operator Tobu Railway. Despite its name, the station building is not actually located in Shiki. The city of Shiki has only one station, Yanasegawa Station, which is the next stop after Shiki Station on the Tōbu Tōjō Line.

== Lines ==
Shiki Station is served by the Tōbu Tōjō Line from Ikebukuro in Tokyo, with some services inter-running via the Tokyo Metro Yūrakuchō Line to Shin-Kiba and the Tokyo Metro Fukutoshin Line to Shibuya and onward via the Tōkyū Tōyoko Line and Minatomirai Line to Motomachi-Chūkagai. Located between Asakadai and Yanasegawa stations, it is 17.8 km from the Ikebukuro terminus. All services except TJ Liner, Kawagoe Limited Express and Rapid Express services stop at this station.

== Station layout ==
The station has two island platforms serving four tracks, with the station building located above, and at a right angle to the platforms. There are two storage tracks adjacent to platform 1, and four storage tracks located between the running lines on the down (Kawagoe) side of the station, as well as a permanent way maintenance storage siding next to platform 4 at the south (Ikebukuro) end of the station.

This station has a season ticket sales office.

=== Platforms ===
1/2	Tōbu Tōjō Line	for Fujimino, Kawagoe, Shinrin-kōen, Ogawamachi, and Yorii
3/4	Tōbu Tōjō Line	for Wakōshi, Narimasu, and Ikebukuro; Tokyo Metro Yurakucho Line for Shin-Kiba; Tokyo Metro Fukutoshin Line for Shibuya; Tōkyū Tōyoko Line for Yokohama; Tōkyū Shin-Yokohama Line for Shin-Yokohama via Sōtetsu Shin-Yokohama Line for Ebina and Shōnandai; Minatomirai Line for Motomachi-Chukagai

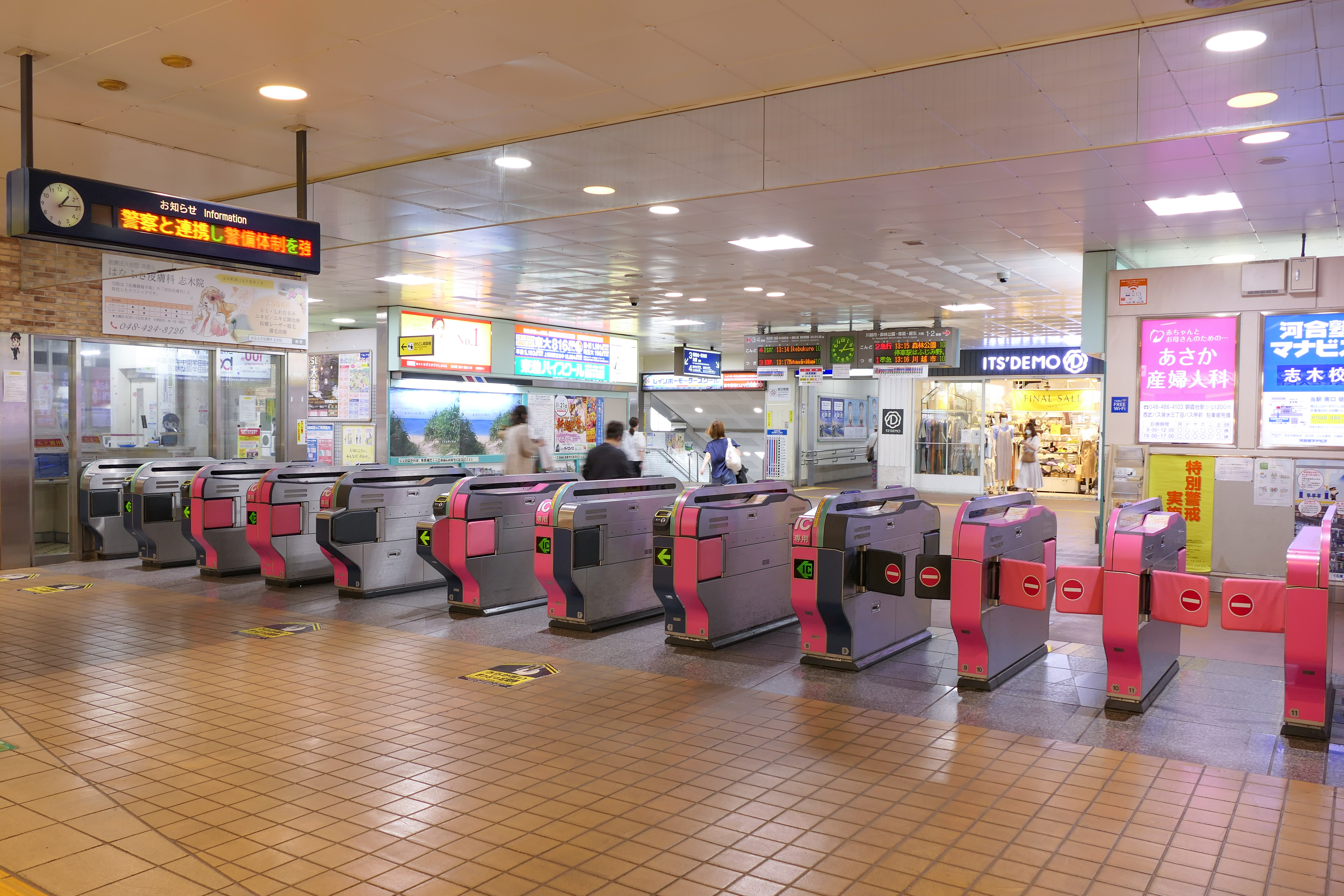
The ticket barriers in July 2021

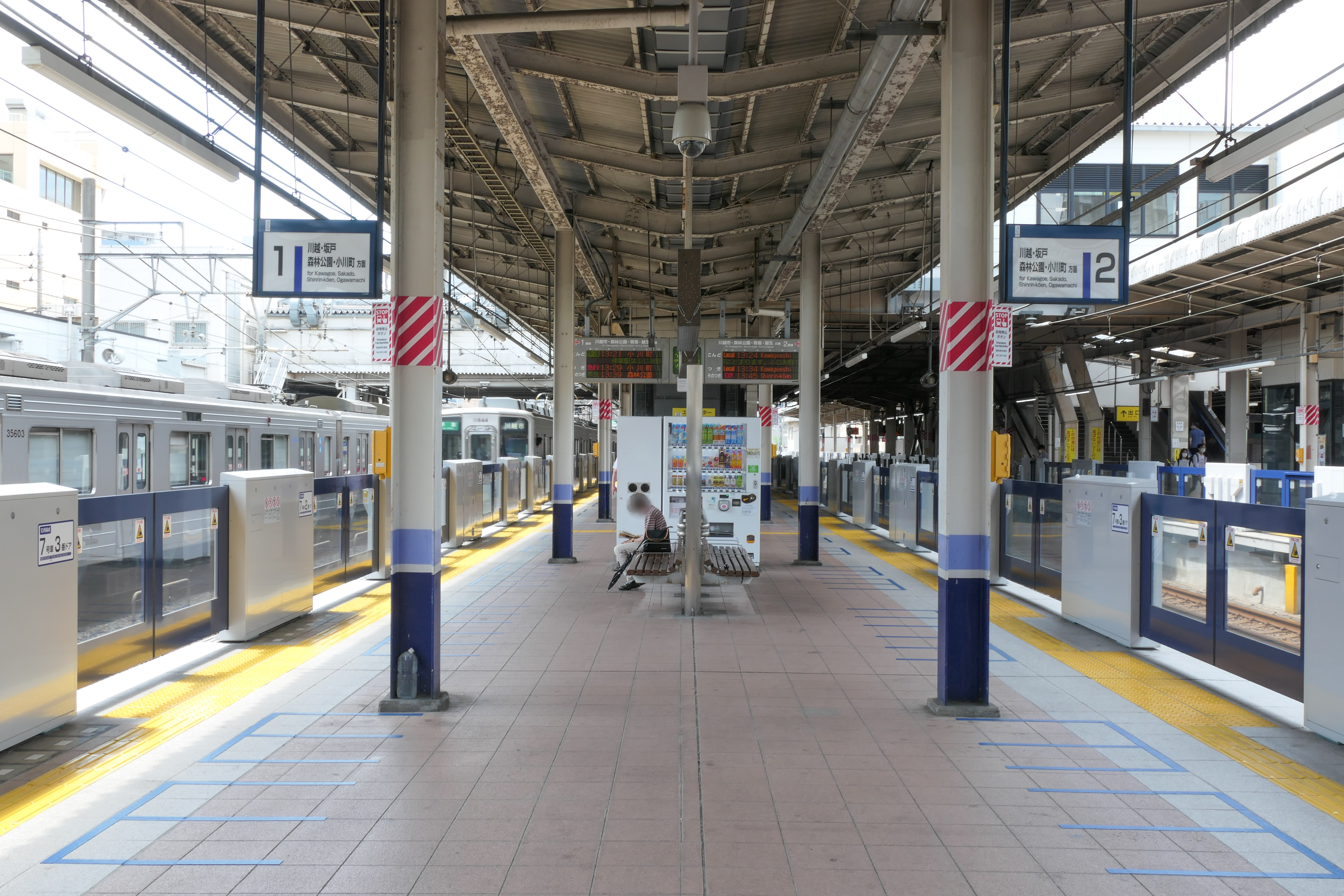
View from platforms 1/2 in July 2021

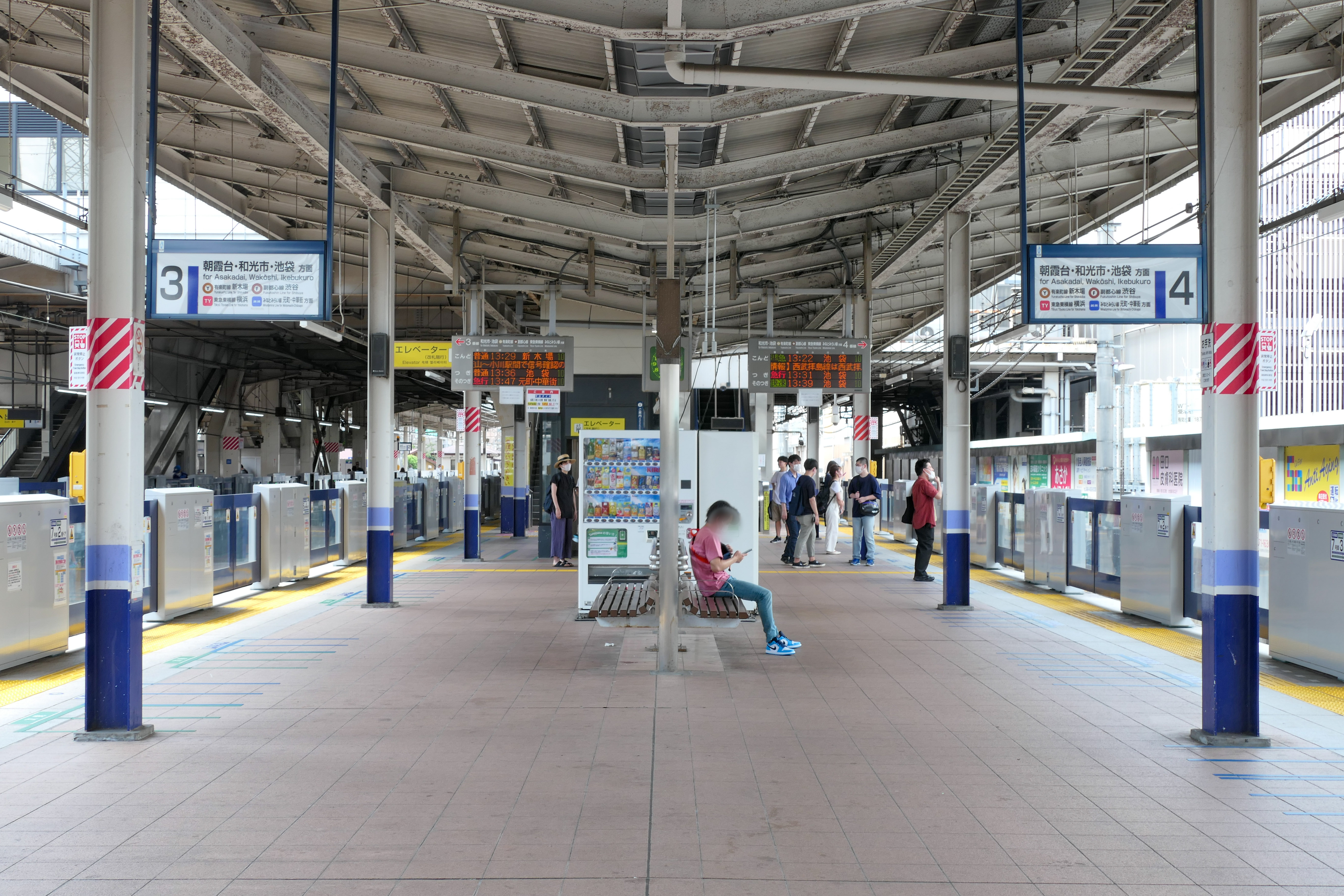
View from platforms 3/4 in July 2021

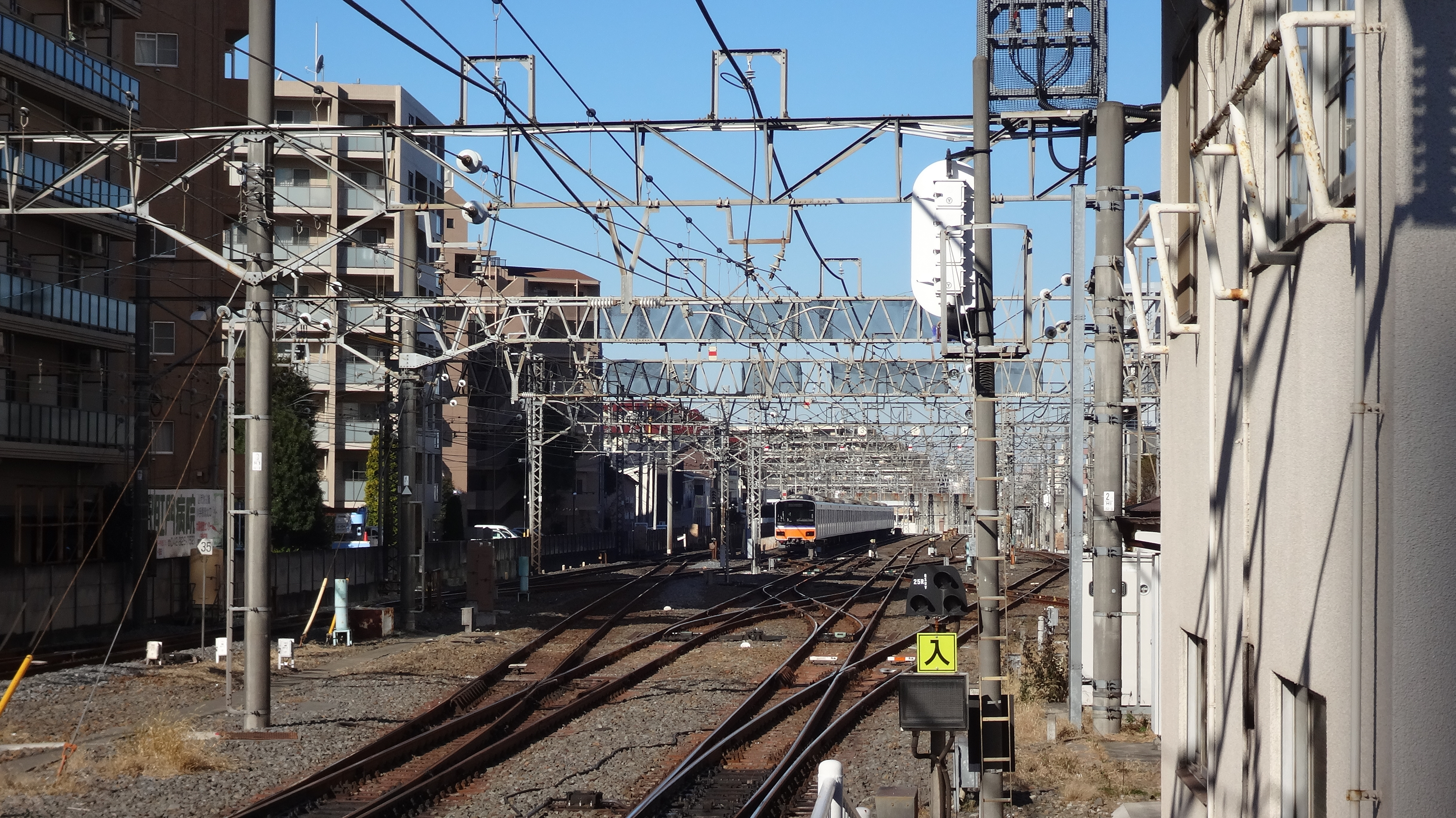
The view from the end of platform 3/4 in January 2016, showing the stabling sidings

== History ==
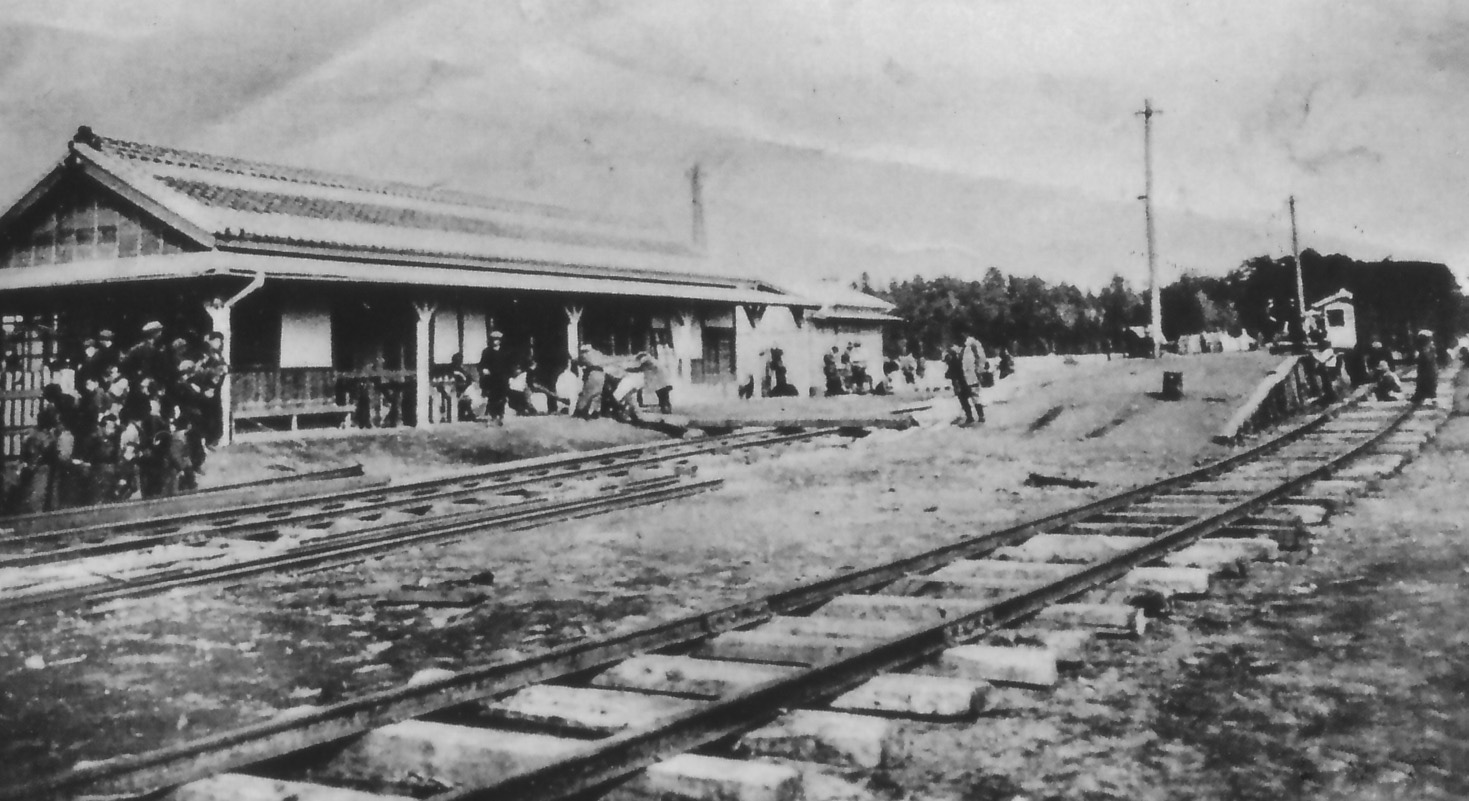
Shiki Station under construction circa 1914

The station opened on 1 May 1914 coinciding with the opening of the Tōjō Railway line from Ikebukuro. At the time of its opening, the station was located in the town of Shiki (later becoming the city of Shiki). In 1960, a new entrance was added on the south side of the station to improve accessibility for students of the Rikkyo High School (present-day Rikkyo Niiza Junior and Senior High School) which had recently relocated from Ikebukuro to Niiza, Saitama. In 1970, to further improve access to the school, the station was moved closer to Ikebukuro, moving it across the boundary from the city of Shiki into Niiza. While Niiza residents petitioned to have the station name changed, this never came about, and the name was used instead for Niiza Station on the Musashino Line, which opened in 1973.

Through-running to and from Shibuya via the Tokyo Metro Fukutoshin Line commenced on 14 June 2008.

From 17 March 2012, station numbering was introduced on the Tōbu Tōjō Line, with Shiki Station becoming "TJ-14".

Through-running to and from Yokohama and Motomachi-Chūkagai via the Tōkyū Tōyoko Line and Minatomirai Line commenced on 16 March 2013.

From March 2023, Shiki Station is no longer a Rapid Express service stop following the abolishment of the Rapid (快速, Kaisoku) services and reorganization of the Tōbu Tōjō Line services. In addition, through service via the Tōkyū Shin-yokohama Line, Sōtetsu Shin-yokohama Line, Sōtetsu Main Line, and Sōtetsu Izumino Line to Shin-Yokohama, Ebina, and Shōnandai commenced.

== Future developments ==
Chest-high platform edge doors are scheduled to be added by the end of fiscal 2020.

== Passenger statistics ==
In fiscal 2019, the station was used by an average of 104,698 passengers daily. Passenger figures for previous years (boarding passengers only) are as shown below.

Fiscal year	Daily average
1950	3,380
1960	8,873
1970	36,254
1980	43,027
1990	50,064
2000	64,325
2010	68,421

== Surrounding area ==
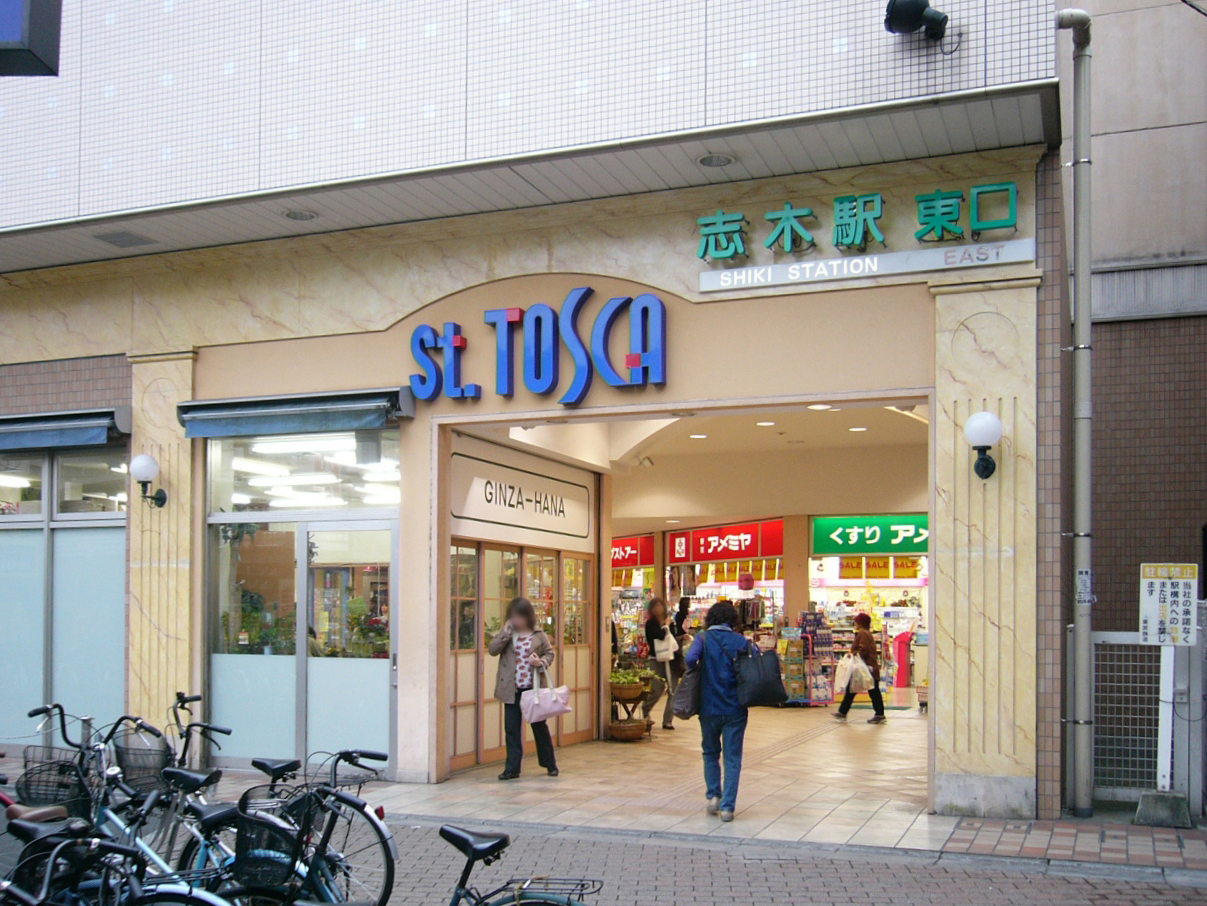
The east entrance in November 2004

- Rikkyo University Niiza Campus
- Rikkyo Niiza Junior and Senior High School
- Keio Shiki Senior High School

== Bus services ==
Tobu Bus and Seibu Bus operate local bus services from the bus stops on either side of the station.

Since 17 July 2008, there is a direct express bus service to and from Narita Airport (via Asakadai Station). The bus stop is on the south side of the station.

== See also ==
- List of railway stations in Japan
