= Hitoshi Aoyagi =

Japanese politician

- 青柳 仁士
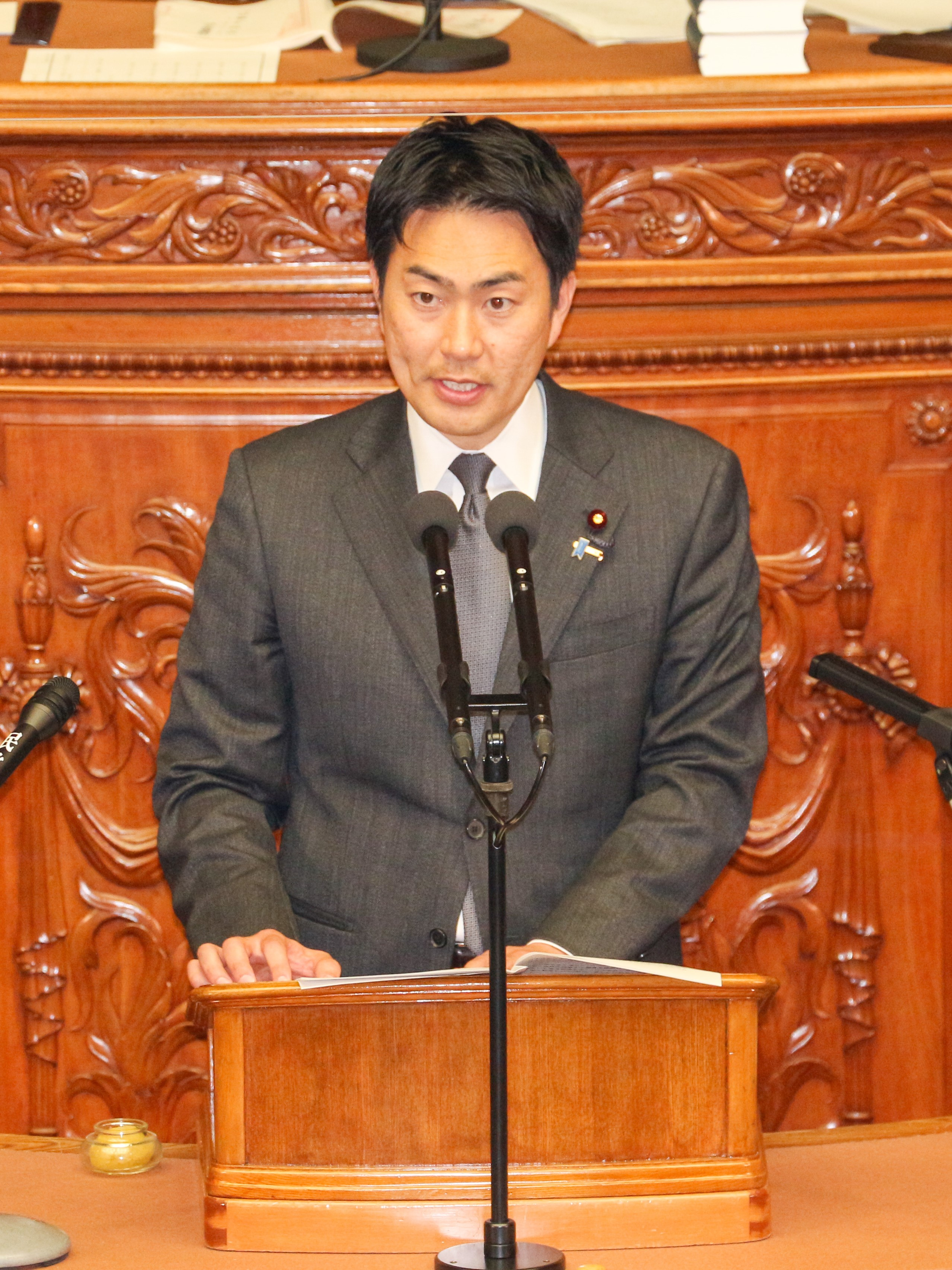
- Aoyagi in 2023

Chair of the Japan Innovation Party Policy Research Council
- In office 2 December 2024 – 12 August 2025

Member of the House of Representatives
- Incumbent
- Assumed office 1 November 2021
- Preceded by: Takashi Nagao
- Constituency: Osaka 14th

Personal details
- Born: 7 November 1978 (age 47) Tachikawa, Tokyo, Japan
- Party: Ishin (since 2015)
- Other political affiliations: Restoration (2012–2014); Innovation (2014–2015)
- Education: Waseda University; Duke University
- Website: Hitoshi Aoyagi website

Hitoshi Aoyagi (青柳 仁士, Aoyagi Hitoshi; born 7 November 1978) is a Japanese politician of the Liberal Democratic Party, who serves as a member of the House of Representatives.

== Early years ==
On 7 November 1978, Aoyagi was born in Tachikawa, Tokyo.

After graduating from the Waseda University's School of Political Science and Economics, he joined the Japan International Cooperation Agency (JICA), where he was in charge of economic, industrial, and energy development in regions including Asia, the Middle East, and Africa. Later, within the Finance Department, he managed the Ministry of Foreign Affairs' technical cooperation budget and led negotiations with the National Diet and the Ministry of Finance. He also worked in the Economic Development Department, dedicating himself to poverty reduction in Africa and economic growth in Asia.

In 2008, he completed his master's degree at the Duke University Sanford School of Public Policy. Following his studies in the United States, he was deployed in 2008 to conflict-affected Afghanistan, where he engaged in peacebuilding and reconstruction assistance projects under the leadership of then-President Sadako Ogata. There, he was responsible for governance sectors—such as politics, military, police, and public finance—as well as urban and infrastructure development. Subsequently, he worked with the United Nations Development Programme (UNDP) in the United States and Sudan. Amidst the ongoing north–south conflict and the Darfur crisis, he operated from a UN perspective to provide peacebuilding and reconstruction support, while also managing mapping initiatives in conflict zones and microfinance projects for the impoverished. In 2010, he served as a Policy Advisor in the Bureau for Relations and Advocacy at the UNDP Headquarters in New York.

== Political career ==
In the 2012 general election, Aoyagi ran from Saitama 4th as a Japan Restoration Party candidate but lost to LDP's Mayuko Toyota.

In 2013, he joined PwC as a Consultant and Manager. He provided strategic consulting for private corporations and policy formulation for central government ministries, supporting Japanese firms in global expansion through public-private partnerships, such as Shinkansen exports countering China's Belt and Road Initiative, and the India Economic Corridor project.

In 2014, Aoyagi was scheduled to run for office from Saitama 4th as a candidate for the Innovation Party; however, due to electoral district adjustments with the DPJ, he ended up running from Saitama 9th district instead. In the 2014 general election, he lost to LDP incumbent Taku Otsuka.

In 2016, he became the Public Information Officer at the UNDP Representation Office in Japan, leading SDGs promotion.

In the 2017 general election, he ran from the Saitama 4th again as a Ishin candidate but was defeated by LDP's Yasushi Hosaka.

In the 2021 general election, he run from Osaka 14th district and defeated LDP incumbent Takashi Nagao.

In the 2024 general election, he defeated LDP's Norifumi Shiokawa and was reelected.

On 2 December 2024, Aoyagi was appointed as Chair of the Japan Innovation Party Policy Research Council by Hirofumi Yoshimura.

On 12 August 2025, following the party's sluggish performance in the House of Councillors election, he announced his resignation along with Secretary-General Seiji Maehara.

In the 2026 general election, he defeated LDP's Motoyuki Odachi and was reelected.

== Scandal ==
=== Dining out despite COVID-19 restrictions ===
On 2 December 2021, while the Osaka prefectural government requested residents to limit dining out to "approximately two hours and a maximum of four people per table" to prevent COVID-19 infections, it was revealed that Osaka Mayor Ichirō Matsui and members of the Japan Innovation Party, including Aoyagi, had held a dinner in Osaka City. The gathering, described as a "review meeting for the last general election," lasted for two and a half to three hours. Aoyagi apologized, stating, "We should not have held a dinner in a manner that could cause misunderstanding. I should have verified the guidelines beforehand."
