= Chuko Hayakawa =

Japanese politician

- 早川 忠孝
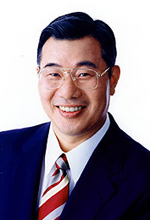
- Official portrait, 2008

Member of the House of Representatives; from Northern Kanto
- In office 10 November 2003 – 21 July 2009
- Preceded by: Multi-member district
- Succeeded by: Hideo Jinpu
- Constituency: PR block (2003–2005); Saitama 4th (2005–2009)

Personal details
- Born: 4 September 1945 (age 81) Nagasaki Prefecture, Japan
- Party: Liberal Democratic
- Education: University of Tokyo

Chuko Hayakawa (早川 忠孝, Hayakawa Chūkō; born 4 September 1945) is a Japanese attorney who previously served as a Liberal Democratic Party (LDP) member of the House of Representatives in the Diet (national legislature), representing Saitama Prefecture.

He is a native of Nagasaki Prefecture and graduate of the University of Tokyo. He worked at the Ministry of Home Affairs from 1969 to 1973 and then resigned to undergo training as an attorney at the Legal Research and Training Institute, beginning private law practice in 1975.

In the 2003 general election, he was elected to the House of Representatives for the first time, after running unsuccessfully in 1996 and 2000. He represented the 4th District of Saitama Prefecture, which includes the cities of Asaka and Shiki.

He served as Justice Parliamentary Secretary under Prime Minister Taro Aso. In February 2009 he announced that he would resign as "an expression of my will for independence" amid an internal revolt against the unpopular prime minister, but retracted his announcement shortly thereafter.

He lost his Diet seat in the 2009 general election and thereafter resumed law practice.
