= Masakazu Watanabe =

Japanese shogi player

- Native name: 渡辺正和
- Maiden name: Yoshida
- Born: January 23, 1986 (age 39)
- Hometown: Ōi, Saitama

Career
- Achieved professional status: October 1, 2008 (aged 22)
- Badge Number: 273
- Rank: 6-dan
- Teacher: Hiromitsu Kanki (7-dan)
- Meijin class: Free
- Ryūō class: 5

Websites
- JSA profile page
- Masakazu Watanabe on Twitter

Masakazu Watanabe (渡辺正和, Watanabe Masakazu; born Masakazu Yoshida on January 23, 1986) is a Japanese professional shogi player ranked 6-dan.

== Early life, amateur shogi and apprenticeship ==
Watanabe was born on January 23, 1986, in Ōi, Saitama (currently Fujimino, Saitama). He learned how to play shogi from his father, and was a well-known strong amateur player as a teenager, performing well in a number of national tournaments. In 2005, he won the 34th Asahi Amateur Meijin Tournament, becoming the youngest person to do so up until that time at the age of 19 years and 3 months. Wanatabe's victory also meant he qualified to participate in the 24th Asahi Open where he continued his good play, winning three straight games against shogi professionals before finally being eliminated from the tournament. Later that same year, he took the entrance exam for the Japan Shogi Association's apprentice school and was accepted at the rank of apprentice professional 1-dan as a student of shogi professional Hiromitsu Kanki.

Yoshida was promoted to apprentice professional 3-dan in the fall of 2007 and finished the 42nd 3-dan League (October 2007 – March 2008) with a record of 13 wins and 5 losses; although his score was the same as the top two finishers in the league, his lower league seed meant his result was only good enough to earn him a promotion point towards professional status. The following season, Watanabe earned a second promotion point after finishing the 43rd 3-dan League (April 2008 – September 2008) in third place, once again with a record of 13 wins and 5 losses. This gave him to option to obtain full professional status and corresponding rank of 4-dan as a "Free Class" player. Wantabe elected to become professional this way and was officially promoted to 4-dan in October 2008.

== Shogi professional ==
Watanabe was promoted from the Free Class to the Meijin Class C2 league in 2011.

Watnabe finished the 77th Meijin Class C2 league (April 2017 – March 2018) with a record of 3 wins and 7 losses, earning a third demotion point which meant automatic demotion to "Free Class" play.

=== Promotion history ===
The promotion history for Watanabe is as follows:

- 1-dan: September 2005
- 4-dan: October 1, 2008
- 5-dan: October 22, 2012
- 6-dan: May 16, 2022

== Personal life ==
Watanabe's maiden name is "Yoshida" (吉田). He took his wife's surname "Watanabe" after getting married in November 2015. His wife Fumie is a competitive karuta player, whose holds the "lifetime queen" title and is a director of the All Japan Karuta Association.
