= Saitama 9th district =

- Parliamentary constituency for the Japanese House of Representatives
- Numbered map of the Saitama Prefecture single seats
- Prefecture: Saitama
- Proportional District: Northern Kanto
- Electorate: 400,885

Current constituency
- Created: 1994
- Seats: One
- Party: LDP
- Representative: Taku Otsuka
- Municipalities: Hannō, Hidaka, Iruma, Sayama, and part of Iruma District.

Saitama 9th district (埼玉県第9区, Saitama-ken dai-kyuku or simply 埼玉9区, Saitama-kyuku) is a single-member constituency of the House of Representatives in the national Diet of Japan located in Saitama Prefecture.

== Areas covered ==
=== Since 2013 ===
- Hannō
- Hidaka
- Iruma
- Sayama
- Part of Iruma District
  - Moroyama
  - Ogose

=== 1994 - 2013 ===
- Hannō
- Hidaka
- Iruma
- Sayama
- Part of Iruma District
  - Moroyama
  - Ogose
  - Naguri

== List of representatives ==
Election	Representative	Party	Notes
1996	Matsushige Ono	LDP	
2000	Matsushige Ono	LDP	
2003	Matsushige Ono	LDP	
2005	Matsushige Ono	LDP	
2009	Fumihiko Igarashi	Democratic	
2012	Taku Otsuka	LDP	
2014	Taku Otsuka	LDP	
2017	Taku Otsuka	LDP	
2021	Taku Otsuka	LDP	
2024	Shinji Sugimura	CDP	
2026	Taku Otsuka	LDP	

== Election results ==
=== 2026 ===
2026
Party	Candidate	Votes	%	±%
LDP	Taku Otsuka	112,062	55.0	▲16.6
Centrist Reform	Shinji Sugimura	91,805	45.0	▲3.4
Registered electors		396,162		
Turnout			54.24	▲2.46
LDP gain from Centrist Reform				

=== 2024 ===
2024
Party	Candidate	Votes	%	±%
CDP	Shinji Sugimura	83,107	41.58	
LDP	Taku Otsuka	78,811	39.43	
Ishin	Hidemasa Kondo	21,680	10.85	New
JCP	Yoshinao Inomata	16,293	8.15	
Majority		4,296	2.15	
Registered electors		399,739		
Turnout			51.78	▼3.66
CDP gain from LDP				

=== 2021 ===
2021
Party	Candidate	Votes	%	±%
LDP	Taku Otsuka	117,002	53.37	
CDP	Shinji Sugimura	80,756	36.84	New
JCP	Miharu Kanda	21,464	9.79	
Majority		36,246	16.53	
Registered electors		404,689		
Turnout			55.44	▲2.81
LDP hold				

=== 2017 ===
2017
Party	Candidate	Votes	%	±%
LDP	Taku Otsuka	111,815	53.19	
Kibō no Tō	Shinji Sugimura	57,599	27.40	New
JCP	Miharu Kanda	40,822	19.42	
Majority		54,216	25.79	
Registered electors		410,494		
Turnout			52.63	▼0.95
LDP hold				

=== 2014 ===
2014
Party	Candidate	Votes	%	±%
LDP	Taku Otsuka	111,316	53.01	
Innovation	Hitoshi Aoyagi	60,121	28.63	
JCP	Sumiko Hiromori	38,534	18.35	
Majority		51,195	24.38	
Registered electors		404,476		
Turnout			53.58	▼5.06
LDP hold				
