= Fujimino =

Fujimino ふじみ野市
- City
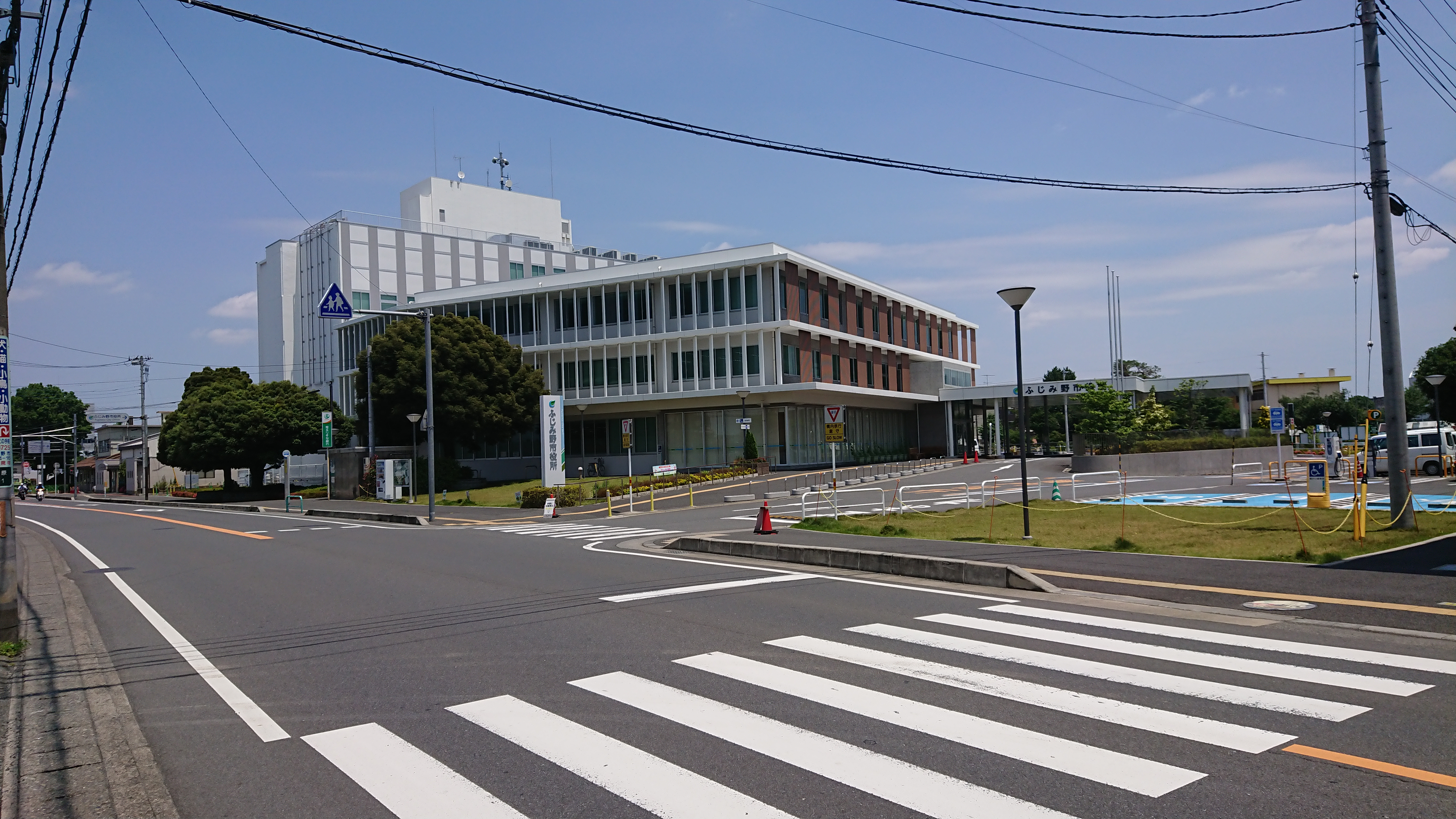
- Fujimino City Hall

- Flag Seal

- Location of Fujimino in Saitama Prefecture

- Location within Japan
- Coordinates: 35°52′46.3″N 139°31′11.2″E
- Country: Japan
- Region: Kantō
- Prefecture: Saitama

Government
  - Mayor: Hiroshi Takahata (since November 2009)

Area
  - Total: 14.64 km^{2} (5.65 sq mi)

Population (January 2021)
  - Total: 114,566
  - Density: 7,826/km^{2} (20,270/sq mi)
- Time zone: UTC+9 (Japan Standard Time)
- Phone number: 049-261-2611
- Address: 1-1-1 Kamifukuoka, Fujimino-shi, Saitama-ken 356-8501
- Website: Official website

Fujimino (ふじみ野市, Fujimino-shi) is a city located in Saitama Prefecture, Japan. As of 1 January 2021, the city had an estimated population of 114,566 in 53,053 households and a population density of 7800 persons per km^{2}. The total area of the city is 14.64 square kilometres (5.65 sq mi).

== Geography ==
Fujimino is located in southern Saitama, in flat land on the northern edge of the Musashino Terrace. It is located approximately 30 kilometers from downtown Tokyo. The Shingashi River, which was a waterway for boat transportation connecting Kawagoe and Tokyo until early modern times, runs along the northern city border. The city measures approximately 7.5 kilometers from east-to-west by 6.0 kilometers from north-to-south.

=== Surrounding municipalities ===
- Saitama Prefecture
  - Fujimi
  - Kawagoe
  - Miyoshi

=== Climate ===
Fujimino has a humid subtropical climate (Köppen Cfa) characterized by warm summers and cool winters with light to no snowfall. The average annual temperature in Fujimino is 14.8 °C. The average annual rainfall is 1426 mm with September as the wettest month. The temperatures are highest on average in August, at around 26.7 °C, and lowest in January, at around 4.0 °C.

== Demographics ==
Per Japanese census data, the population of Fujimino expanded rapidly in the late 20th century and has grown at a slower pace in the 21st.

Historical population
| Year | Pop. | ±% |
|---|---|---|
| 1920 | 5,669 | — |
| 1930 | 6,273 | +10.7% |
| 1940 | 7,409 | +18.1% |
| 1950 | 11,996 | +61.9% |
| 1960 | 21,601 | +80.1% |
| 1970 | 71,360 | +230.4% |
| 1980 | 93,467 | +31.0% |
| 1990 | 97,974 | +4.8% |
| 2000 | 100,118 | +2.2% |
| 2010 | 105,695 | +5.6% |
| 2020 | 113,597 | +7.5% |

== History ==
Earthenware pottery fragments from the Kamifukuoka Shell Mound dating to the Early Jōmon period, were discovered beneath the Dainihon Print Company in Fujimino, indicating a long period of settlement. The city also has an important early Kofun period archaeological site, the Gongenyama Tumuli Cluster, from the late 3rd century. During the Edo period, the port of Fukuoka was an important river port on a branch of the Arakawa River and was under the control of Kawagoe Domain.

The village of Fukuoka was created within Iruma District, Saitama with the establishment of the modern municipalities system on April 1, 1889. The first public housing estates (Uenodai and Kasumigaoka) in Japan were built in Fukuoka after the Second World War. The village was raised to town status in 1960 as population expanded rapidly due to new town developments, and to city status on April 10, 1972, changing its name to Kamifukuoka to avoid confusion with the more famous city of Fukuoka in Kyushu.

The city of Fujimino was established on October 1, 2005, from the merger of the city of Kamifukuoka, and the neighboring town of Ōi (from Iruma District).

== Government ==
Fujimino has a mayor-council form of government with a directly elected mayor and a unicameral city council of 21 members. Fujimino, together with the town of Miyoshi, contributes two members to the Saitama Prefectural Assembly. In terms of national politics, the city is part of Saitama 8th district of the lower house of the Diet of Japan.

== Economy ==
Due to its location, Fujimino is primarily a bedroom community with over 25% of its population commuting to the Tokyo metropolis for work. There are a number of industrial parks in the city.

== Education ==
Fujimino has 13 public elementary schools and six public middle schools operated by the city government, and one public high school operated by the Saitama Prefectural Board of Education. Bunkyo University also has a campus in Fujimino.

== Public facilities ==
There are two libraries, two public swimming pools (summer season only), and a number of public halls and community centres.

== Transportation ==
=== Railway ===
Tōbu Railway - Tōbu Tōjō Line

- Kami-Fukuoka

=== Highway ===
- National Route 254

== Local attractions ==
- Benten-no-mori Park, which has a small temple noted for cherry blossoms in spring, and kudzu in autumn.
- Jizoin Temple, famous for a weeping cherry tree which is more than 300 years old.
- Chūō Park.
- Green Park, on the bank of the Shingashi River, noted as a location where Tokugawa Ieyasu used to go falconing.
- Shingashi River, used for transporting goods in the Edo period, with a warehouse from the 1870s now called the Fukuokagashi Riverside Heritage Hall.

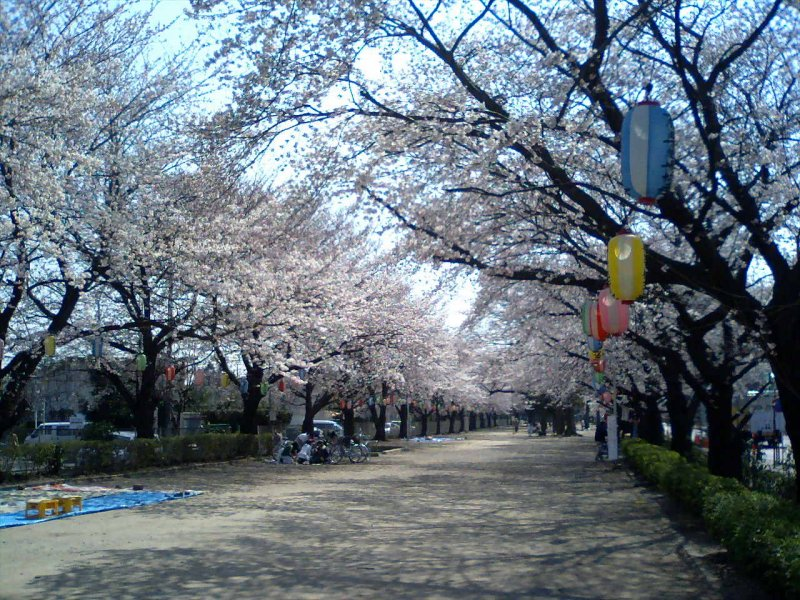
Chūō Park during the cherry blossom season

== Festivals ==
There are two major festivals in Fujimino: the Kamifukuoka Tanabata Festival and the Oi Festival.

=== Kamifukuoka Tanabata Festival ===
This is a lively festival held on the first Saturday and Sunday of August every year since more than 50 years ago. It includes a bamboo decoration contest, Awa Odori dancing, Bon Odori dancing, and traditional taiko drumming.

=== Oi Festival ===
Oi Festival is held in the middle of July every year and features historic mikoshi portable shrines and a parade of floats, with Yosakoi dancing by dancers with naruko clappers in their hands.

== Noted people from Fujimino ==
- Mari Hoshino, actress
- Aoi Hiiragi, manga artist
- Yumi Kakazu, voice actress
- Eri Nitta, musician and actress
- Hikari Ōta, comedian
- Shigenobu Shima, professional baseball player
