= Miyoshi, Saitama =

Miyoshi 三芳町
- Town
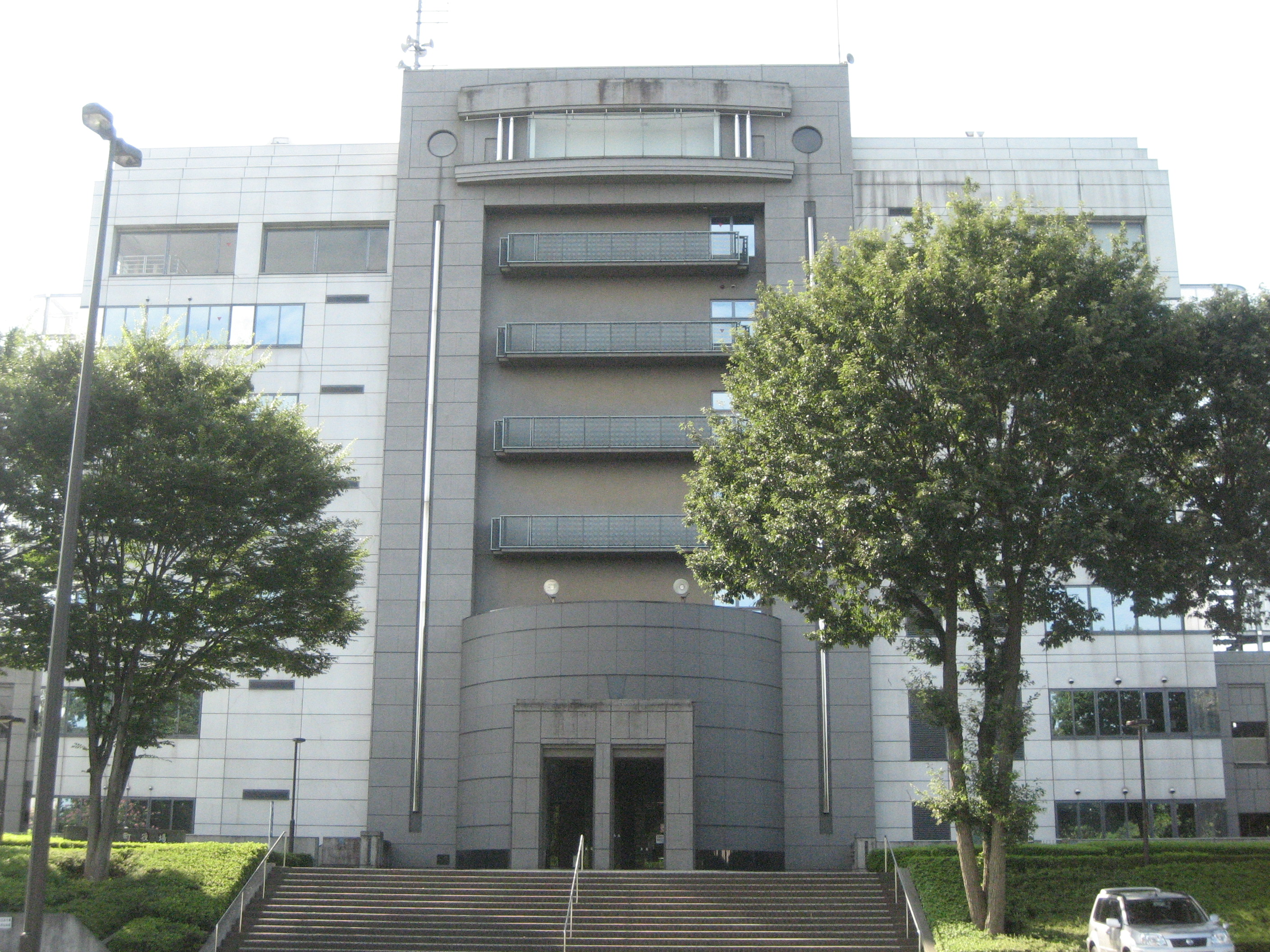
- Miyoshi town office

- Flag Seal

- Location of Miyoshi in Saitama Prefecture

- Coordinates: 35°49′42.2″N 139°31′35.3″E
- Country: Japan
- Region: Kantō
- Prefecture: Saitama
- District: Iruma

Area
  - Total: 15.33 km^{2} (5.92 sq mi)

Population (February 2021)
  - Total: 38,101
  - Density: 2,485/km^{2} (6,437/sq mi)
- Time zone: UTC+9 (Japan Standard Time)
- Tree: Zelkova serrata
- Flower: Chrysanthemum
- Bird: Eurasian skylark
- Phone number: 049-258-0019
- Address: 1100-1 Fujikubo, Miyoshi-machi, Iruma-gun, Saitama-ken 354-8555
- Website: Official website

Miyoshi (三芳町, Miyoshi-machi) is a town located in Saitama Prefecture, Japan. As of 28 February 2021, the town had an estimated population of 38,101 in 16,692 households and a population density of 2500 persons per km^{2}. The total area of the town is 15.33 square kilometres (5.92 sq mi).

== Geography ==
Miyoshi is located in south-central Saitama Prefecture.

=== Surrounding municipalities ===
Saitama Prefecture

- Fujimi
- Fujimino
- Kawagoe
- Niiza
- Shiki
- Tokorozawa

=== Climate ===
Miyoshi has a humid subtropical climate (Köppen Cfa) characterized by warm summers and cool winters with light to no snowfall. The average annual temperature in Miyoshi is 14.0 °C. The average annual rainfall is 1647 mm with September as the wettest month. The temperatures are highest on average in August, at around 25.7 °C, and lowest in January, at around 2.3 °C.

== Demographics ==
Per Japanese census data, the population of Miyoshi saw strong growth starting around 1960 which leveled off around 1990.

Historical population
| Year | Pop. | ±% |
|---|---|---|
| 1920 | 3,418 | — |
| 1930 | 3,602 | +5.4% |
| 1940 | 3,711 | +3.0% |
| 1950 | 4,280 | +15.3% |
| 1960 | 4,329 | +1.1% |
| 1970 | 14,475 | +234.4% |
| 1980 | 28,978 | +100.2% |
| 1990 | 35,067 | +21.0% |
| 2000 | 35,752 | +2.0% |
| 2010 | 38,706 | +8.3% |
| 2020 | 38,434 | −0.7% |

== History ==
The place name of "Miyoshin-no-sato" appears in the Heian period Ise Monogatari, and was part of ancient Musashi Province. During the Edo period, it was part of the holdings of Kawagoe Domain and was a rural agricultural area with few inhabitants. The village of Miyoshi was created within Iruma District, Saitama on April 1, 1889, with the establishment of the modern municipalities system. It was elevated to town status on November 3, 1970.

== Government ==
Miyoshi has a mayor-council form of government with a directly elected mayor and a unicameral town council of 15 members. Miyoshi, together with the city of Fujimino, contributes two members to the Saitama Prefectural Assembly. In terms of national politics, the town is part of Saitama 8th district of the lower house of the Diet of Japan.

== Economy ==
The economy of Miyoshi is largely agricultural, with sweet potatoes a major crop. However, the town is also a bedroom community with some 25% of its working population commuting to nearby Tokyo.

== Education ==
Miyoshi has five public elementary schools and three public middle schools operated by the town government. The town does not have a high school. Chiba-based Shukutoku University has a campus in Miyoshi.

== Transportation ==
=== Railway ===
- Miyoshi is not served by any passenger rail service.

=== Highway ===
- Kan-etsu Expressway
- National Route 254
- National Route 462

== Sister cities ==
- Petaling Jaya, Malaysia

== Noted people from Miyoshi ==
- Hitomi Yoshizawa, musician
