= Yasushi Hosaka =

Japanese politician (born 1974)

- 穂坂 泰
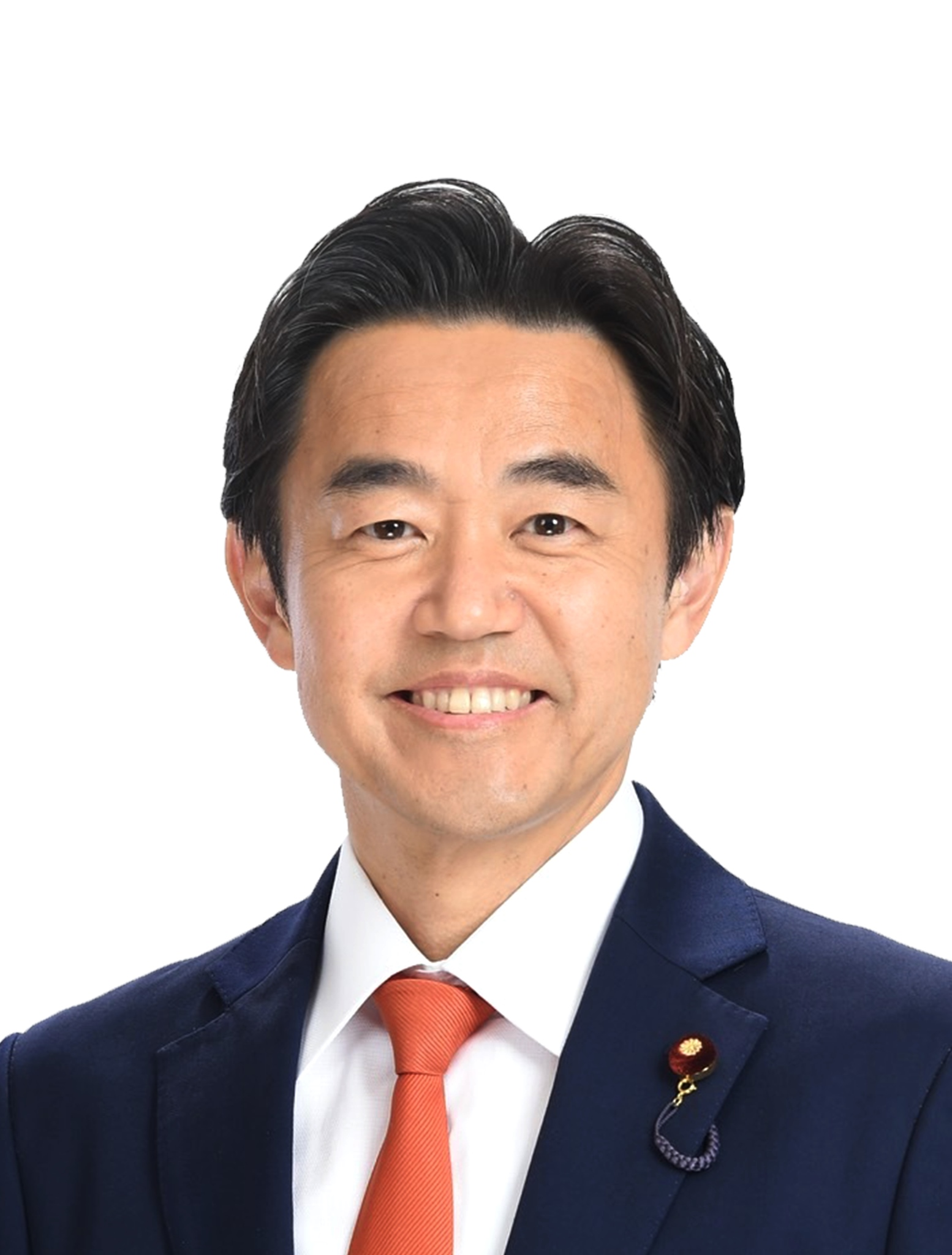
- Official portrait, 2024

Member of the House of Representatives
- Incumbent
- Assumed office 22 October 2017
- Preceded by: Mayuko Toyota
- Constituency: Saitama 4th

Member of the Shiki City Council
- In office 2016–2017

Personal details
- Born: 17 February 1974 (age 52) Shiki, Saitama, Japan
- Party: Liberal Democratic
- Education: Aoyama Gakuin University; Teikyo University

Yasushi Hosaka (穂坂泰, Hosaka Yasushi; born 17 February 1974) is a Japanese politician serving as a member of the House of Representatives since 2017. From 2016 to 2017, he was a city councillor of Shiki.
