= Hiromitsu Kanki =

Japanese shogi player

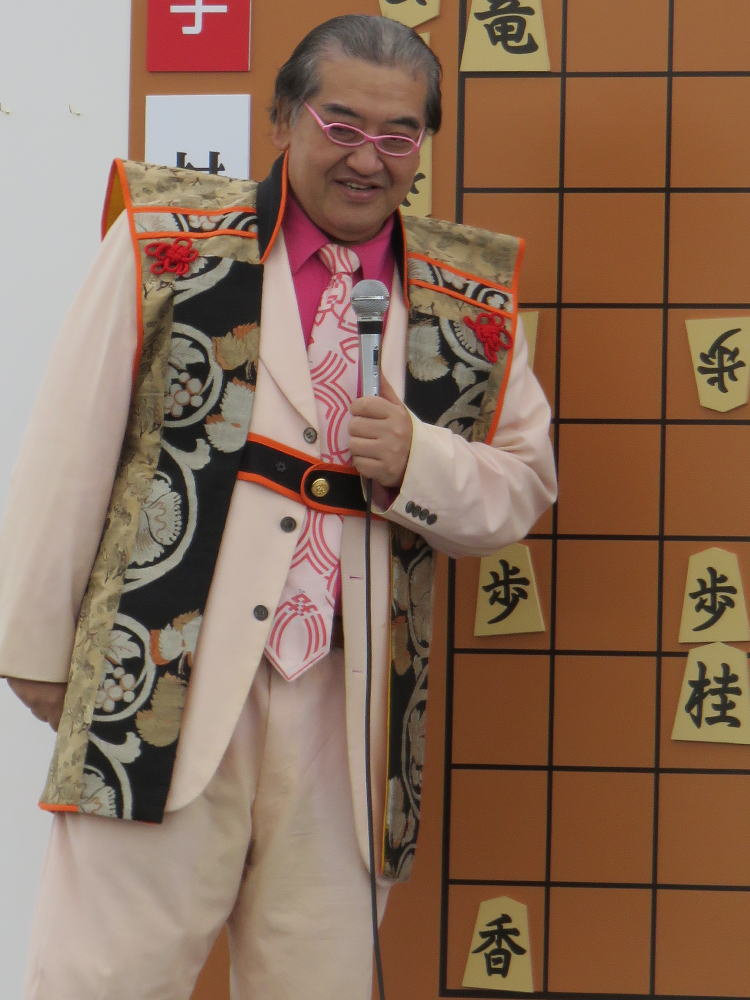
- Kanki at a human shogi event in November 2015.
- Native name: 神吉宏充
- Born: January 1, 1940 (age 86)
- Hometown: Kakogawa, Hyōgo

Career
- Achieved professional status: July 26, 1983 (aged 43)
- Badge number: 160
- Rank: 7-dan
- Retired: June 1, 2011 (27 years)
- Teacher: Kunio Naitō (9-dan)
- Notable students: Masakazu Watanabe

Websites
- JSA profile page

Hiromitsu Kanki (神吉宏充, Kanki Hiromitsu; born January 1, 1940) is a Japanese retired professional shogi player who achieved the rank of 7-dan.

He is known for wearing colorful suits on television programs as a shogi expert.

== Shogi professional ==
=== Promotion history ===
The promotion history for Kanki was as follows:

- 1-kyū: 1978
- 1-dan: 1979
- 4-dan: July 26, 1983
- 5-Dan: January 17, 1988
- 6-dan: April 11, 1996
- 7-dan: April 1, 2010
- Retired: June 1, 2011

=== Awards and honors ===
Kanki received the Japan Shogi Association's received the "25 Years Service Award" in 2008 for being an active professional for 25 years.
