= Saitama 4th district =

Legislative district of Japan

- Parliamentary constituency for the Japanese House of Representatives
- Numbered map of Saitama Prefecture single-member districts
- Prefecture: Saitama
- Proportional District: Northern Kanto
- Electorate: 389,389

Current constituency
- Created: 1994
- Seats: One
- Party: Liberal Democratic
- Representative: Yasushi Hosaka
- Municipalities: Asaka, Niiza, Shiki, and Wakō.

Saitama 4th district (埼玉県第4区, Saitama-ken dai-yonku or simply 埼玉4区, Saitama-ken yonku) is a single-member constituency of the House of Representatives in the national Diet of Japan located in Saitama Prefecture.

== Areas covered ==
=== since 2002 ===
- Asaka
- Niiza
- Shiki
- Wakō

=== 1994-2002 ===
- Asaka
- Niiza
- Shiki
- Wakō
- Toda

== List of representatives ==
Election	Representative	Party	Notes
1996	Kiyoshi Ueda	New Frontier	
1996	Kiyoshi Ueda	From Five	
1996	Kiyoshi Ueda	Good Governance	
2000	Kiyoshi Ueda	Democratic	
2003	Hideo Jinpu	Democratic	
2005	Chuko Hayakawa	Liberal Democratic	
2009	Hideo Jinpu	Democratic	
2012	Mayuko Toyota	Liberal Democratic	
2014	Mayuko Toyota	Liberal Democratic	
2014	Mayuko Toyota	Independent	
2017	Yasushi Hosaka	Liberal Democratic	
2021	Yasushi Hosaka	Liberal Democratic	
2024	Yasushi Hosaka	Liberal Democratic	
2026	Yasushi Hosaka	Liberal Democratic	

== Election results ==
=== 2026 ===
2026
Party	Candidate	Votes	%	±%
LDP	Yasushi Hosaka (incumbent)	110,312	52.9	▲11.1
DPP	Mitsuhiro Kishida	56,582	27.1	▲0.3
JCP	Kaoru Kudō	25,501	12.2	▼1.9
Ishin	Michiko Iseda	6,072	7.7	▼9.6
Registered electors		389,557		
Turnout			55.89	▲3.84
LDP hold				

=== 2024 ===
2024
Party	Candidate	Votes	%	±%
LDP	Yasushi Hosaka (incumbent)	82,125	41,8	▼10.5
DPP	Mitsuhiro Kishida (elected in N. Kanto PR)	52,728	26.8	▲3.4
Ishin	Yasuyuki Watanabe	34,048	17.3	
JCP	Kaoru Kudō	27,763	14.1	▼2.9
Registered electors		389,142		
Turnout			52,05	▼2.44
LDP hold				

=== 2021 ===
2021
Party	Candidate	Votes	%	±%
Liberal Democratic (endorsed by Komeito)	Yasushi Hosaka (incumbent)	107,135	52.26	
DPP	Katsuhiko Asano	47,863	23.35	New
Communist	Kaoru Kudo	34,897	17.02	
Independent	Nobuhiko Endō	11,733	5.72	New
Independent	Hiroki Ogasawara	3,358	1.64	N/A
Majority		59,272	28.91	
Registered electors		386,796		
Turnout			54.49	▲0.43
LDP hold				

=== 2017 ===
2017
Party	Candidate	Votes	%	±%
Liberal Democratic (endorsed by Komeito)	Yasushi Hosaka	74,287	37.41	
Kibō no Tō	Yoshinori Yoshida	50,165	25.27	New
Communist	Hideyoshi Asaka	29,125	14.67	
Innovation	Hitoshi Aoyagi	23,362	11.77	New
Independent	Mayuko Toyota (incumbent)	21,614	10.89	New
Majority		24,122	12.14	
Registered electors		376,437		
Turnout			54.06	▲0.72
LDP gain from Independent				

=== 2014 ===
2014
Party	Candidate	Votes	%	±%
Liberal Democratic (endorsed by Komeito)	Mayuko Toyota (incumbent)	88,730	48.11	
Democratic	Hideo Jinpu	62,062	33.65	
Communist	Haruko Sakurai	33,646	18.24	
Majority		26,668	14.46	
Registered electors		360,274		
Turnout			53.34	▼4.69
LDP hold				

=== 2012 ===
2012
Party	Candidate	Votes	%	±%
Liberal Democratic (endorsed by Komeito)	Mayuko Toyota	71,061	35.94	
Democratic (endorsed by PNP)	Hideo Jinpu (incumbent)	53,366	26.99	
Restoration	Hitoshi Aoyagi	46,303	23.42	New
Communist	Haruko Sakurai	23,360	11.82	
Independent	Hiroki Ogasawara	3,617	1.83	New
Majority		17,695	8.95	
Registered electors		355,100		
Turnout			58.03	▼7.86
LDP gain from Democratic				

=== 2009 ===
2009
Party	Candidate	Votes	%	±%
Democratic	Hideo Jinpu (PR seat incumbent)	121,137	54.25	
Liberal Democratic	Chuko Hayakawa (incumbent)	74,889	33.54	
Communist	Haruko Sakurai	23,966	10.73	
Happiness Realization	Takemitsu Mizuno	3,311	1.48	New
Majority		46,248	20.71	
Registered electors		346,769		
Turnout			65.89	▲0.94
Democratic gain from LDP				

=== 2005 ===
2005
Party	Candidate	Votes	%	±%
Liberal Democratic	Chuko Hayakawa (PR seat incumbent)	103,366	48.78	
Democratic	Hideo Jinpu (incumbent) (won PR seat)	86,229	40.69	
Communist	Haruko Sakurai	22,322	10.53	
Majority		17,137	8.09	
Registered electors		333,735		
Turnout			64.95	▲11.35
LDP gain from Democratic				

=== 2003 ===
2003
Party	Candidate	Votes	%	±%
Democratic	Hideo Jinpu	81,367	48.00	
Liberal Democratic	Chuko Hayakawa (won PR seat)	69,625	41.07	
Communist	Sumiko Ayabe	18,527	10.93	
Majority		11,742	6.93	
Turnout			53.60	▼2.49
Democratic hold				

=== 2000 ===
2000
Party	Candidate	Votes	%	±%
Democratic	Kiyoshi Ueda (incumbent)	106,131	49.30	New
Liberal Democratic	Chuko Hayakawa	70,062	32.55	
Communist	Sumiko Ayabe	39,069	18.15	
Majority		36,069	16.75	
Turnout			56.09	▲5.36
Democratic hold				

=== 1996 ===
1996
Party	Candidate	Votes	%	±%
New Frontier	Kiyoshi Ueda	72,420	39.25	New
Liberal Democratic	Chuko Hayakawa	46,869	25.40	New
Communist	Sumiko Ayabe	33,670	18.25	New
Democratic	Satoshi Ishizuka	28,401	15.39	New
Liberal League	Ryusuke Hayakawa	3,140	1.70	New
Majority		25,551	13.85	
Turnout			50.73	
New Frontier win (new seat)				
