= Matsushige Ono =

Japanese politician (1936–2026)

- 大野 松茂
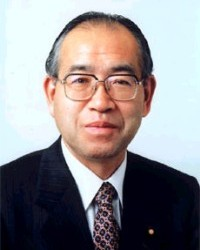
- Official portrait, 2002

Deputy Chief Cabinet Secretary (Political affairs, House of Representatives)
- In office 27 August 2007 – 2 August 2008
- Prime Minister: Shinzo Abe; Yasuo Fukuda
- Preceded by: Hakubun Shimomura
- Succeeded by: Ryū Shionoya

Member of the House of Representatives
- In office 21 October 1996 – 21 July 2009
- Preceded by: Constituency established
- Succeeded by: Fumihiko Igarashi
- Constituency: Saitama 9th

Mayor of Sayama
- In office 15 May 1986 – 17 May 1994
- Preceded by: Saichi Machida
- Succeeded by: Junichi Machida

Member of the Saitama Prefectural Assembly
- In office 23 April 1979 – 1 May 1986

Personal details
- Born: 15 January 1936 Sayama, Saitama, Japan
- Died: 7 August 2026 (aged 90) Sayama, Saitama, Japan
- Party: Liberal Democratic

Matsushige Ono (大野 松茂, Ōno Matsushige; 15 January 1936 – 7 August 2026) was a Japanese politician of the Liberal Democratic Party, who served as a member of the House of Representatives in the Diet (national legislature). A native of Sayama, Saitama and high school graduate, he was elected to the Saitama Prefectural Assembly in 1979 where he served for two terms, and then to be the mayor of his hometown Sayama in 1986, serving for two terms. He was elected to the House of Representatives for the first time in 1996. Ono died from pneumonia on 7 August 2026, at the age of 90.
