= Mari Hoshino =

Japanese actress and singer (born 1981)

- 星野 真里
- Born: July 27, 1981 (age 45); Kamifukuoka, Saitama
- Education: Aoyama Gakuin University
- Occupations: Actress, singer
- Years active: 1988–present
- Notable credit(s): Otome Sakamoto in Kinpachi-sensei; Kana in Platonic Sex
- Spouse: Takahiro Takano (m. 2011)
- Children: 1 daughter

Mari Hoshino (星野 真里, Hoshino Mari; born July 27, 1981 in Kamifukuoka, Saitama) is a Japanese actress and singer.

== Background ==
She graduated from Aoyama Gakuin University. Most well known for her lead role as Otome Sakamoto in the TBS drama, Kinpachi-sensei, Hoshino has starred in several dramas in recent years. Her main role in Platonic Sex was somewhat controversial as it was rather contrary to her image as one possessing pure values. She has also published two photographic books as well as about six CDs. Of the Japanese dramas shown in Los Angeles, a substantial fraction of them have Mari in the cast.

== Personal life ==
In September 2011, she married an TBS announcer, Takahiro Takano. On July 30, 2015, she gave birth to their first daughter, named Fuka (ふうか). In September 2024, she revealed on her Instagram that her daughter has congenital myopathy. However she later corrected that her daughter is actually has centronuclear myopathy.

== Filmography ==
=== Television ===
- Kinpachi-sensei (1995–2011), Otome Sakamoto
- Eve-Santa Clause Dreaming (1997), Mika
- Thursday Ghost Story (1997, ep 15), Risa Sonoda
- House of the Devils (1999), Rieko
- Live (1999), Nana Ayukawa
- Bus Stop (2000), Haruka Kitahara
- Platonic Sex (2001), Kana
- Shin Hoshi no Kinka (2001), Mahiru Morita
- Ōoku (2004), Otama / Narrator
- A Happy Birthday (2009), Natsuki Hoshi

=== Films ===
- Blooming Again (2004), Kazuko Inoue
- Infection (2004), Nurse
- Sayonara Midori-chan (2005), Yūko
- Keitai Kareshi (2009), Miki Asanuma
- Battlefield Baseball (2011), Shinnosuke Suzuki
- Kaigan-dōri no Neko-mimi Tantei (2022)
- Sheep in the Box (2026)
- All Our Tomorrows (2026), Shizuka Naito
