= Iruma District =

District in Japan

Coordinates: 35.921°N 139.297°E

Iruma (入間郡, Iruma-gun) is a district located in Saitama Prefecture, Japan.

In the 2005 census reports, the district has an estimated population of 89,552. The total area is 89.77 km^{2}.

The district consists of three towns:

- Miyoshi
- Moroyama
- Ogose

== District timeline ==
- April 9, 1972: The town of Fukuoka gains city status and is renamed Kamifukuoka.
- April 10, 1972: The town of Fujimi gains city status.
- September 1, 1976: The town of Sakado gains city status.
- September 1, 1991: The town of Tsurugashima gains city status.
- October 1, 1991: The town of Hidaka gains city status.
- January 1, 2005: The village of Naguri merges with the city of Hannō.
- October 1, 2005: The town of Ōi merges with the city of Kamifukuoka to create the new city of Fujimino.
