= 2008 Fujimi mayoral election =

Fujimi, Saitama held a mayoral election on July 13, 2008. Independent candidate Shingo Hoshino won the election, beating incumbent mayor Kiyoshi Urano supported by the Liberal Democratic Party and Masaru Kaneko, supported by the Japanese Communist Party. Polling turnout increased almost 5%, up from record-low 36% in 2004 to just above 41%.

== Results ==
Mayoral election 2008: Fujimi City
Party	Candidate	Votes	%	±%
Independent	Shingo Hoshino (星野 信吾)	13,132	38.09%	N/A
Independent, JCP	Masaru Kaneko (金子 勝)	12,301	35.67%	N/A
Independent, LDP, NKP	Kiyoshi Urano (浦野 清)	8,693	25.21%	−22.99%
Turnout		34,477	41.23%	4.85%
