= Shigenobu Shima =

Japanese baseball player and coach (born 1976)

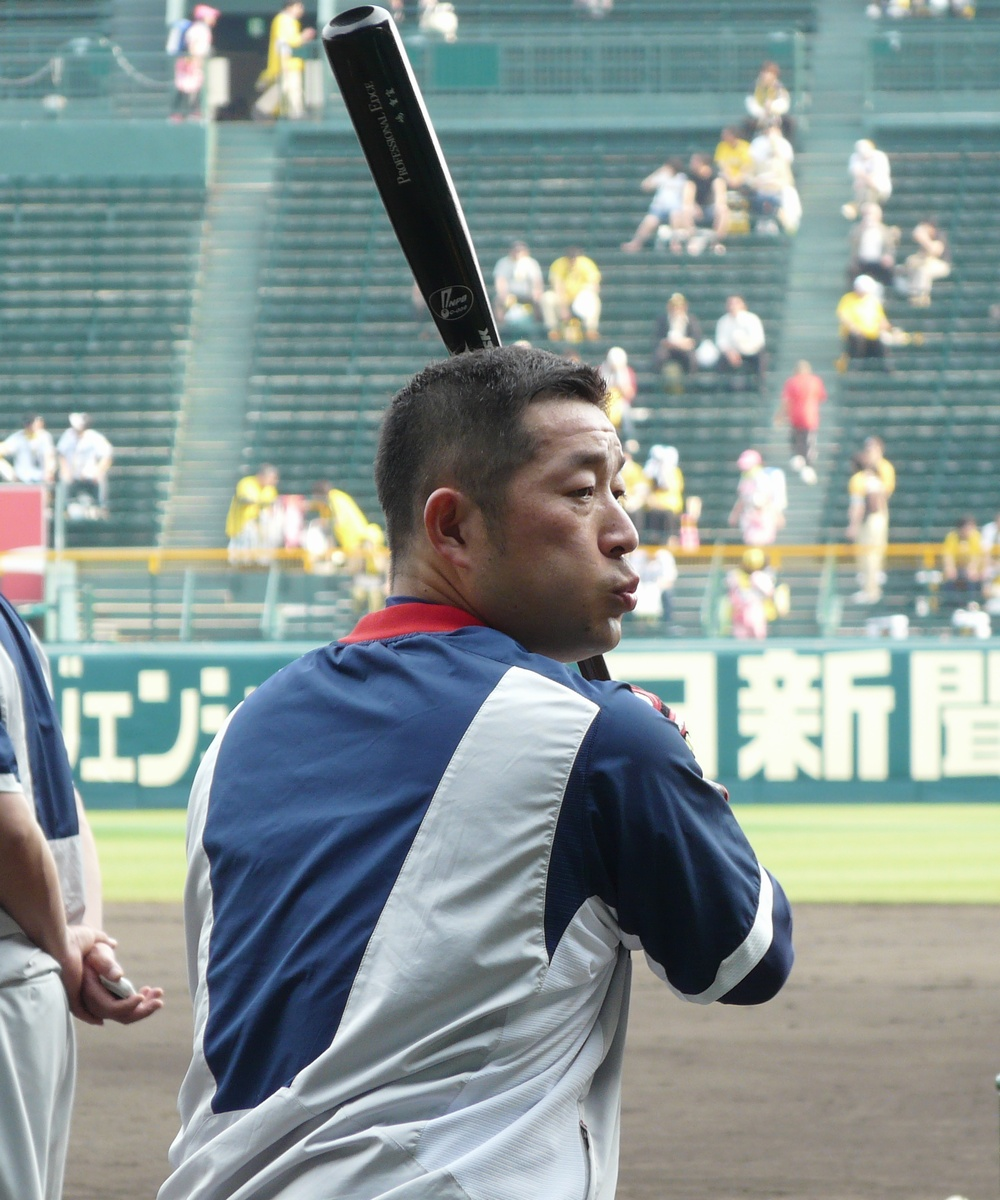
- Shima with the Saitama Seibu Lions
- Outfielder / Coach
- Born: June 16, 1976 (age 50); Kamifukuoka, Saitama
- Batted: Left Threw: Left

NPB debut
- June 29, 1997, for the Hiroshima Toyo Carp

Last NPB appearance
- 2013, for the Saitama Seibu Lions

NPB statistics
- Batting average: .279
- Home runs: 126
- Hits: 868
- Stats at Baseball Reference

Teams
- As player: Hiroshima Toyo Carp (1995–2011); Saitama Seibu Lions (2012–2013); As coach: Saitama Seibu Lions (2014–2024)

Career highlights and awards
- 1× NPB All-Star (2004); 1× Best Nine Award (2004); 1× Central League Batting Champion (2004)
- Last updated on: 11 February 2014

Shigenobu Shima (嶋 重宣, born June 16, 1976, in Kamifukuoka, Saitama, Japan) is a former Nippon Professional Baseball outfielder.
