= Fujimi, Saitama =

Fujimi 富士見市
- City
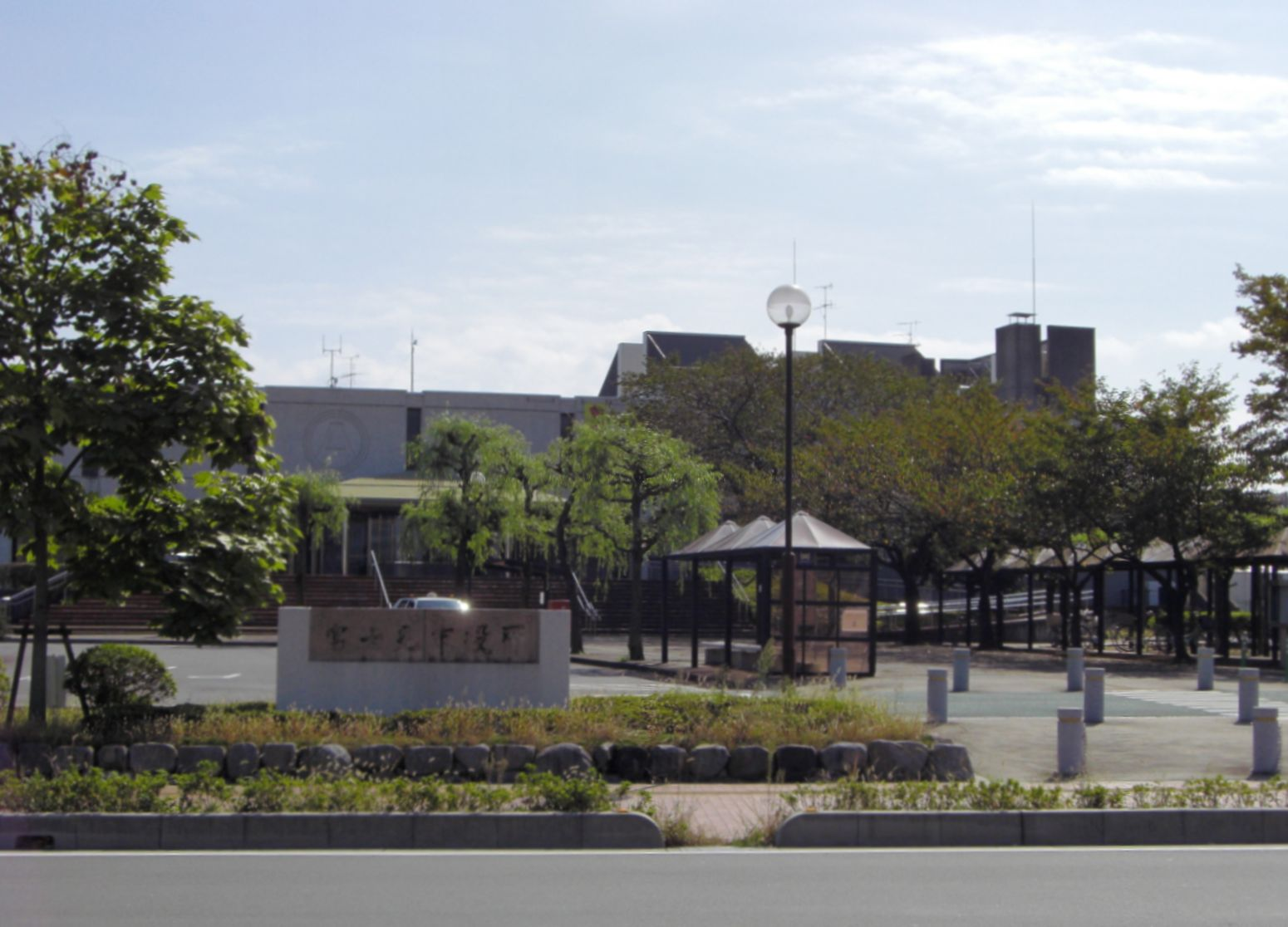
- Fujimi City Hall

- Flag Seal

- Location of Fujimi in Saitama Prefecture

- Location within Japan
- Coordinates: 35°51′23.6″N 139°32′57″E
- Country: Japan
- Region: Kantō
- Prefecture: Saitama

Area
  - Total: 19.77 km^{2} (7.63 sq mi)

Population (January 1, 2021)
  - Total: 112,211
  - Density: 5,676/km^{2} (14,700/sq mi)
- Time zone: UTC+9 (Japan Standard Time)
- Tree: Zelkova serrata
- Flower: Wisteria floribunda
- Bird: Common kingfisher
- Phone number: 49-251-2711
- Address: 1800 Tsuruma, Fujimi-shi, Saitama-ken 354-8511
- Website: Official website

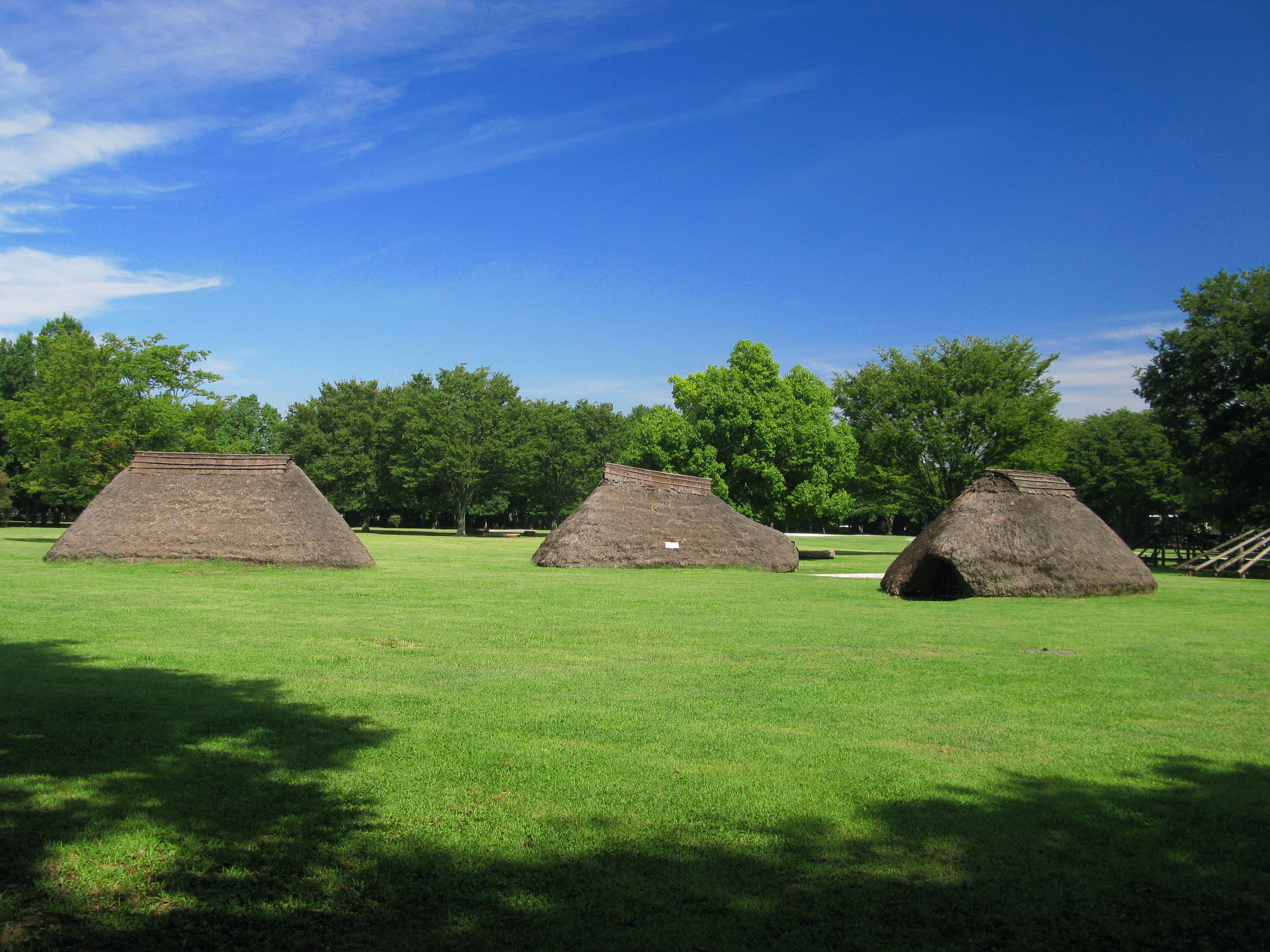
Fujimi Mizukokaiduka Park

Fujimi (富士見市, Fujimi-shi) is a city located in Saitama Prefecture, Japan. As of 1 January 2021, the city had an estimated population of 112,211 in 53,051 households and a population density of 5700 persons per km^{2}. The total area of the city is 19.77 square kilometres (7.63 sq mi).

== Geography ==
Located in southwestern Saitama Prefecture, Fujimi is in the middle of the Kantō plain with an average altitude of 8 to 21 meters above sea level. It is approximately 10 kilometers from the prefectural capital at Saitama and 30 kilometers from downtown Tokyo. The northeastern half of the city area is a lowland with the Arakawa and Shingashi Rivers, and the southwestern half part of the Musashino Plateau. The urban area is primarily in the southwest. The city has approximate dimensions of 7.0 kilometers from east-to-west and 6.8 kilometers from north-to-south.

=== Surrounding municipalities ===
- Saitama Prefecture
  - Fujimino
  - Kawagoe
  - Miyoshi
  - Saitama (Nishi-ku, Sakura-ku)
  - Shiki

=== Climate ===
Fujimi has a humid subtropical climate (Köppen Cfa) characterized by warm summers and cool winters with light to no snowfall. The average annual temperature in Fujimi is 14.9 °C. The average annual rainfall is 1426 mm with September as the wettest month. The temperatures are highest on average in August, at around 26.7 °C, and lowest in January, at around 4.2 °C.

== Demographics ==
Per Japanese census data, the population of Fujimi expanded rapidly in the late 20th century and has grown at a slower rate in the 21st.

Historical population
Year	Pop.	±%
1950	10,648	—
1960	12,030	+13.0%
1970	51,775	+330.4%
1980	79,591	+53.7%
1990	94,864	+19.2%
2000	103,247	+8.8%
2010	106,736	+3.4%
2020	111,859	+4.8%

== History ==
The area of modern Fujimi is part of ancient Musashi Province. The villages of Tsuruse and Nanbata created within Iruma District, Saitama with the establishment of the modern municipalities system on April 1, 1889. The village of Fujimi was created on September 30, 1956, by the merger of the villages of Tsuruse and Nanbata with the village of Mizutani from Kitaadachi District. Large scale public housing projects and new town developments in the 1960s and 1970s led to a rapid increase in population, and Fujimi attained town status on April 1, 1964, and city status on April 10, 1972.

== Government ==
Fujimi has a mayor-council form of government with a directly elected mayor and a unicameral city council of 21 members. Fujimi contributes one member to the Saitama Prefectural Assembly. In terms of national politics, the city is part of Saitama 7th district of the lower house of the Diet of Japan.

=== Elections ===
- 2008 Fujimi mayoral election

== Economy ==
Due to this location, Fujimi is primarily a bedroom community with over 30% of its population commuting to the Tokyo metropolis for work.

== Education ==
Fujimi has 11 public elementary schools and six public middle schools operated by the city government, and one public high school operated by the Saitama Prefectural Board of Education. In addition, the prefecture also operates one special education school for the handicapped.

== Transportation ==
=== Railway ===
Tōbu Railway - Tōbu Tōjō Line

- Fujimino - Tsuruse - Mizuhodai

=== Highway ===
- National Route 254
- National Route 463

== Sister cities ==
- Šabac, Serbia

== Local attractions ==
- Mizuko Shell Midden archaeological site
- Site of Nambada Castle

== Noted people from Fujimi ==
- Ryota Imanari, professional baseball player
- Ryunosuke Kamiki, actor
- Yumi Matsuzawa, musician
