= Ōi, Saitama =

Dissolved municipality in Saitama prefecture, Japan

Coordinates: 35.851°N 139.517°E

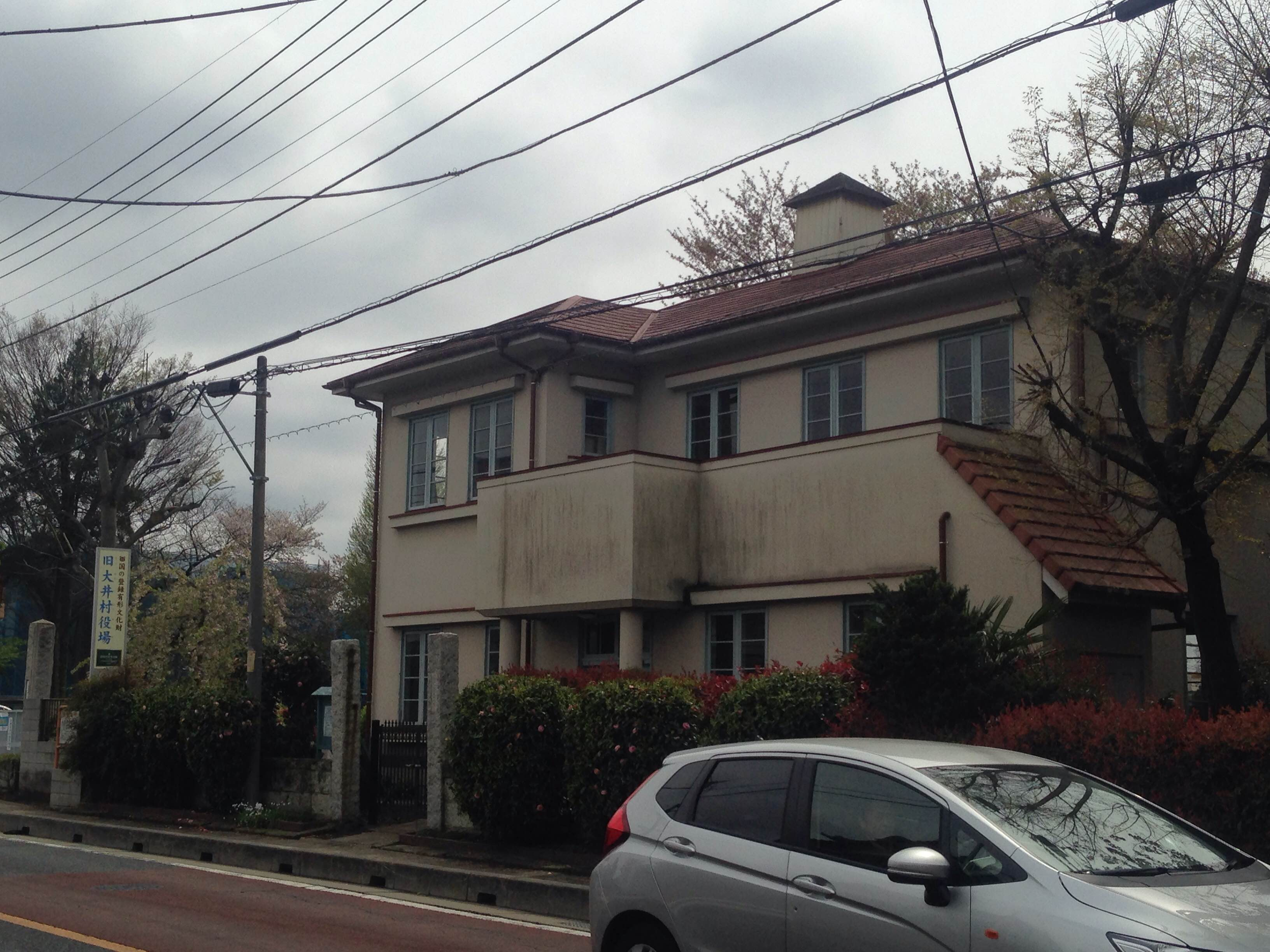
It's old Oi village hall with Oi elementary-school in fujimino-city.

Ōi (大井町, Ōi-machi) was a town located in Iruma District, Saitama Prefecture, Japan.

As of 2003, the town had an estimated population of 47,276 and a population density of 6,014.76 persons per km^{2}. The total area was 7.86 km^{2}.

On October 1, 2005, Ōi, along with the city of Kamifukuoka, was merged to create the city of Fujimino.
