= Taku Otsuka =

Japanese politician

- 大塚 拓
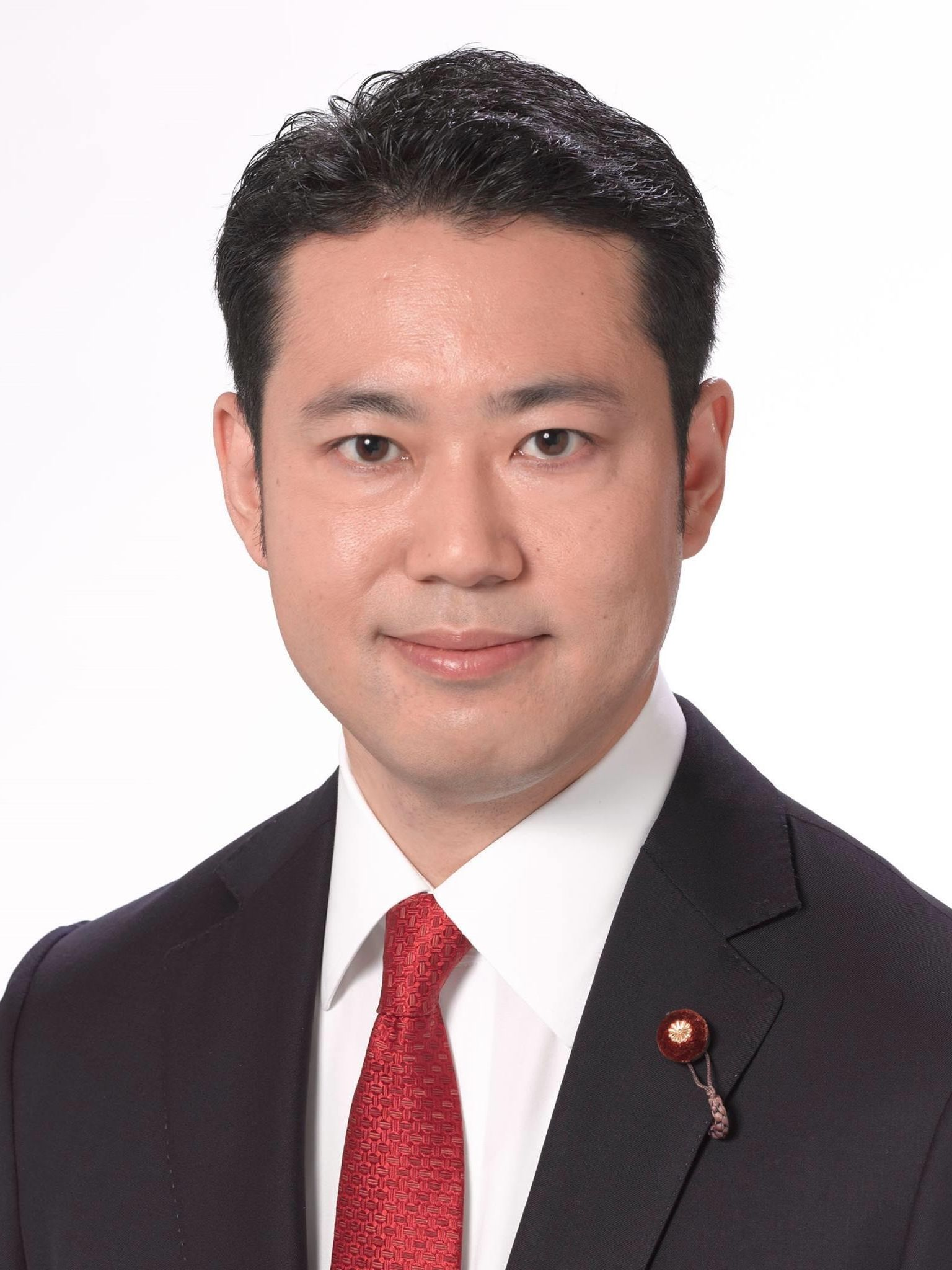
- Official portrait, 2019

Member of the House of Representatives
- Incumbent
- Assumed office 9 February 2026
- Preceded by: Shinji Sugimura
- Constituency: Saitama 9th
- In office 18 December 2012 – 9 October 2024
- Preceded by: Fumihiko Igarashi
- Succeeded by: Shinji Sugimura
- Constituency: Saitama 9th
- In office 13 September 2005 – 21 July 2009
- Constituency: Tokyo PR

Personal details
- Born: 14 June 1973 (age 53) Tokyo, Japan
- Party: Liberal Democratic
- Spouse: Tamayo Marukawa (m. 2008)
- Children: 1
- Education: Keio University; John F. Kennedy School of Government; Harvard University

Taku Otsuka (大塚 拓, Ōtsuka Taku; born 14 June 1973) is a Japanese politician who is serving as a member of the House of Representatives in the National Diet for the Liberal Democratic Party. He is affiliated with the revisionist lobby Nippon Kaigi.

== Personal and corporate backgrounds ==
A native of Tokyo, he graduated from Keio University with a bachelor's degree in Political Science in March 1997. In April 1997, he got a job in The Bank of Tokyo-Mitsubishi (now The Bank of Tokyo-Mitsubishi UFJ). After retiring from the bank in March 2003, he started managing real estate in order to earn studying in the United States and caring for his father. In July 2003, he participated in a summer program at Stanford University. In June 2005, he received a master's degree in Public Policy from John F. Kennedy School of Government at Harvard University in the United States.

He is married to Tamayo Marukawa (a member of the House of Councillors and a former announcer of TV Asahi). Their wedding ceremony was held in Meiji Shrine on June 16, 2008.

== Political career ==
He was elected to the House of Representatives (constituency: Saitama 9) for the first time in 2005.

- State Minister of Finance
- Parliamentary Vice-Minister of Justice
- Director, Judicial Affairs Division, LDP
- Chief Secretary, Japan-Australia Parliamentary Association
- Chief Secretary, Japan-Philippines, Parliamentary Friendship Association
- Areas of interest:
  - Defense/National Security Policies
  - International Trade/Monetary Policies
  - Science Technology Policies

Otsuka received an estimated 8,740,000 yen in unreported income from Seiwakai (Abe) faction fundraising parties between 2018 and 2022 related to the 2023–2024 Japanese slush fund scandal.
