= Mayuko Toyota =

Japanese politician

- 豊田 真由子
- Official portrait, 2015

Member of the House of Representatives
- Incumbent
- Assumed office 8 February 2026
- Constituency: Northern Kanto PR
- In office 18 December 2012 – 28 September 2017
- Preceded by: Hideo Jinpu
- Succeeded by: Yasushi Hosaka
- Constituency: Saitama 4th

Personal details
- Born: 10 October 1974 (age 52) Funabashi, Chiba, Japan
- Party: Sanseitō (since 2025)
- Other political affiliations: LDP (2012–2017); Independent (2017–2025)
- Children: 2
- Education: University of Tokyo; Harvard University

Mayuko Toyota (豊田 真由子) (born 10 October 1974) is a Japanese politician and former bureaucrat at the Ministry of Health, Labour and Welfare. From 2012 to 2017, she served two terms in the House of Representatives as a member of the Liberal Democratic Party. In August 2017, she left the LDP after being accused of assault by her secretary. In 2026, she gained a seat again in the House of Representatives as a member of Sanseitō.

== Early life ==
Toyota was born in Funabashi, Chiba on October 10, 1974. She is the second of three sisters. She entered Tokyo University in 1993, and took public law courses under Takeshi Sasaki.

== Career ==
=== As a bureaucrat ===
After graduating from University of Tokyo’s law department in 1997, Toyota started working at the Ministry of Health and Welfare. In 2000, Toyota entered Harvard University as part of a government-sponsored study abroad program. She studied public health, and graduated with a master of science degree in 2002.

After the 2001 Central Government Reform, Toyota worked in the social welfare and health departments. In 2003 she worked with the Financial Services Agency on supplemental health insurance program for the elderly. In 2007, Toyota moved to Geneva to work at the Permanent Mission of Japan to the International Organizations in Geneva. She had a son in Geneva and a daughter in Paris.

Toyota returned to Japan and the Ministry in 2011, where she worked in the elder care department. In the aftermath of the 2011 Tohoku earthquake and tsunami, she spearheaded policies to evacuate and provide emergency shelters for the elderly.

=== As a politician ===
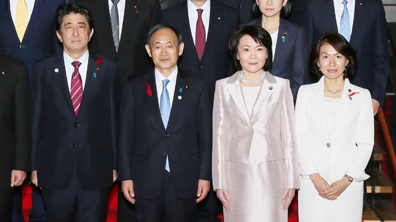
Toyota (far right) with Shinzo Abe, Yoshihide Suga, and Miki Yamada on October 9, 2015

After leaving the Ministry of Health, Labor, and Welfare, Toyota campaigned for a seat in the House of Representatives during the 2012 Japanese general election. She ran as a member of the Liberal Democratic Party, representing Saitama prefecture's 4th district. She broke her ankle during the race, but continued campaigning.

As a member of the Liberal Democratic Party, Toyota served on various committees related to health, welfare, and labor. She was also a member of the Seiwa Political Analysis Council.

Toyota was reelected during the 2014 Japanese general election by a landslide.

On June 22, 2017, Shūkan Shinchō reported that Toyota had verbally and physically abused her secretary on May 20, 2017. She had struck the man's head and face repeatedly as he drove in a car with her, calling him a "baldy" and telling him he should die. Toyota left the Liberal Democratic Party on the same day, but it was not formally acknowledged until August 10. After the allegations came to light, Toyota was hospitalized for her "unstable mental condition".

The assault charges were dropped on December 27, 2017, after the victim submitted a letter to the prosecutor's office saying that he didn't want Toyota punished. Nonetheless, the scandal brought to light the rampant abuse of Diet secretaries.

Toyota ran for office as an independent during the 2017 Japanese general election, but lost.
