= Hideo Jinpu =

Japanese politician (born 1961)

- 神風 英男
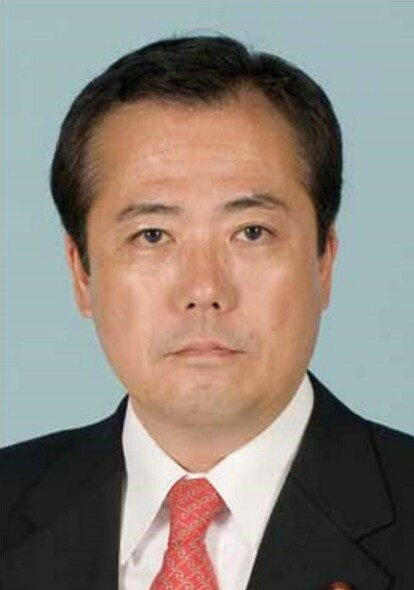
- Official portrait, 2011

Member of the House of Representatives; from Northern Kanto
- In office 10 November 2003 – 16 November 2012
- Preceded by: Kiyoshi Ueda
- Succeeded by: Mayuko Toyota
- Constituency: Saitama 4th (2003–2005); PR block (2005–2009); Saitama 4th (2009–2012)

Personal details
- Born: 10 October 1961 (age 64) Koga, Ibaraki, Japan
- Party: Democratic
- Education: Hosei University

Hideo Jinpu (神風 英男, Jinpū Hideo; born 10 October 1961) is a former Japanese politician of the Democratic Party of Japan, who served as a member of the House of Representatives in the Diet (national legislature). A native of Koga, Ibaraki and graduate of Hosei University, he ran unsuccessfully for the assembly of Ibaraki Prefecture in 1994. He was elected to the House of Representatives for the first time in 2003.
