= Kamifukuoka, Saitama =

Dissolved municipality in Saitama prefecture, Japan

Coordinates: 35°52′N 139°31′E

Kamifukuoka (上福岡市, Kamifukuoka-shi) was a city in Saitama Prefecture, Japan.

As of 2003, the city had an estimated population of 54,486 and a population density of approximately 8,000 persons per km^{2}. The total area was 6.81 km^{2}.

== History ==
The city was founded on April 10, 1972.

On October 1, 2005, Kamifukuoka, along with the town of Ōi (from Iruma District), was merged to create the city of Fujimino.

== See also ==
- Kami-Fukuoka Station
