= Shiki, Saitama =

Shiki 志木市
- City
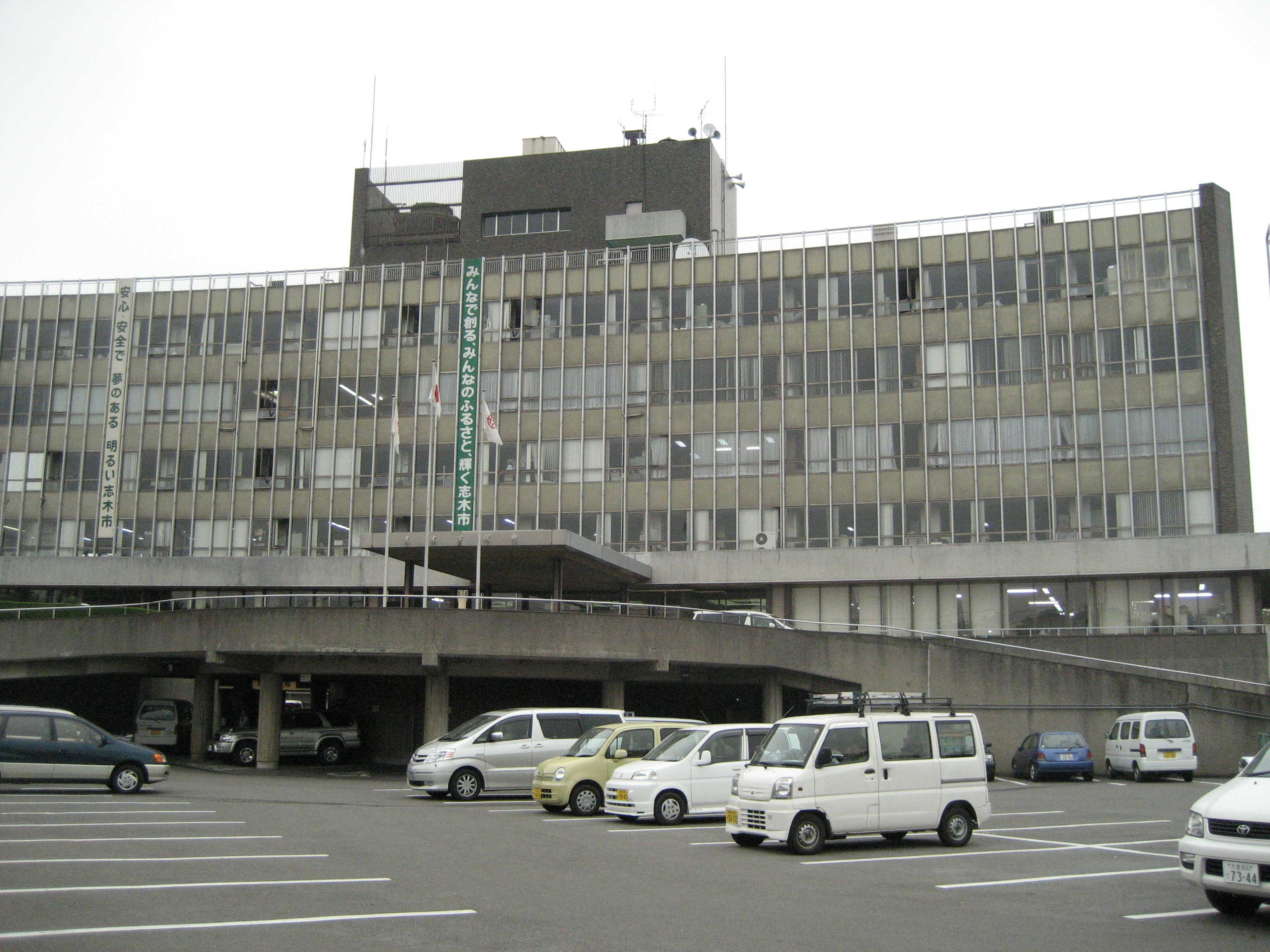
- Shiki City Hall

- Flag Seal

- Location of Shiki in Saitama Prefecture

- Location within Japan
- Coordinates: 35°50′12″N 139°34′49.1″E
- Country: Japan
- Region: Kantō
- Prefecture: Saitama

Area
  - Total: 9.05 km^{2} (3.49 sq mi)

Population (February 201)
  - Total: 76,445
  - Density: 8,450/km^{2} (21,900/sq mi)
- Time zone: UTC+9 (Japan Standard Time)
- Tree: Osmanthus
- Flower: Azalea
- Phone number: 048-464-1111
- Address: 1-1-1 Nakamuneoka, Shiki-shi, Saitama-ken 353-0002
- Website: Official website

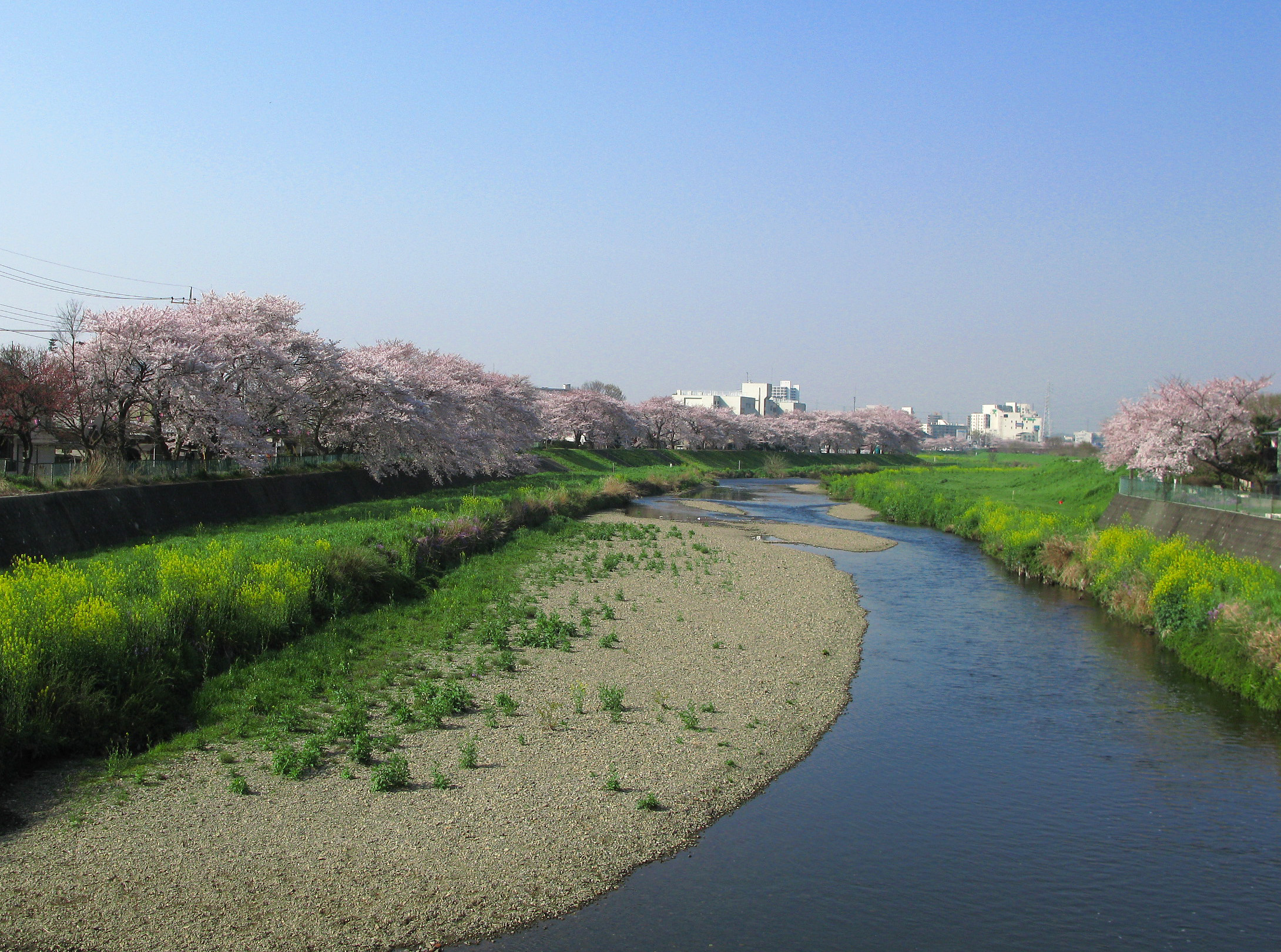
Yanase River in Shiki

Shiki (志木市, Shiki-shi) is a city located in Saitama Prefecture, Japan. As of 1 January 2021, the city had an estimated population of 76,445 in 35,407 households and a population density of 8400 persons per km^{2}. The total area of the city is 9.05 square kilometres (3.49 sq mi).

== Geography ==
Located in southern Saitama Prefecture on the eastern bank of the Arakawa River, Shiki is within easy commuting distance from downtown Tokyo. The Shingashi River and Yanase River flow through the city, and the two rivers merge in the city. The city can be divided into three parts: the Arakawa lowland between the Arakawa and Shingashi rivers, the Musashino plateau including the area around the station, and the Yanase river lowland formed by the Yanase river eroding the Musashino plateau. The Arakawa lowland is about five meters above sea level, and the Musashino plateau is 10 to 20 meters above sea level.

=== Surrounding municipalities ===
Saitama Prefecture

- Asaka
- Fujimi
- Miyoshi
- Niiza
- Saitama (Sakura-ku)

=== Climate ===
Shiki has a humid subtropical climate (Köppen Cfa) characterized by warm summers and cool winters with light to no snowfall. The average annual temperature in Shiki is 15.0 °C. The average annual rainfall is 1428 mm with September as the wettest month. The temperatures are highest on average in August, at around 26.9 °C, and lowest in January, at around 4.3 °C.

== Demographics ==
Per Japanese census data, the population of Shiki has grown substantially over the past 70 years.

Historical population
Year	Pop.	±%
1950	9,721	—
1960	12,259	+26.1%
1970	32,047	+161.4%
1980	50,925	+58.9%
1990	63,401	+24.5%
2000	65,076	+2.6%
2010	69,611	+7.0%
2020	75,346	+8.2%

== History ==
The area of Shiki developed from the Edo period as a river port connecting northern Kantō region with Edo. The town of Shiki was created within Niikura District, Saitama with the establishment of the modern municipalities system on April 1, 1889. Niikura District was abolished in 1894, becoming part of Kitaadachi District, Saitama. Shiki merged with neighboring Muraoka Village on May 3, 1955, becoming the town of Adachi. Adachi was elevated to city status on October 26, 1970, and was renamed Shiki.

=== Before Edo period ===
- December 19, 1351 (Kanno 2nd year) – The battle of Hanekura takes place around Hanekura Bridge in Muneoka, and Ashikaga Takauji's forces defeat Ashikaga Tadayoshi. For the background, see Kannō disturbance.
- Mid-Muromachi period – Oishi Akishige, a vassal of the Yamanouchi Uesugi, builds Kashiwa Castle as a residence.
- 1524 (4th year of Daiei) – Kashiwa Castle is rebuilt by Oishi Nobuyoshi, and the west Guo and Sotobori are formed.
- 1538 (7th year of Astronomy) – Oishi Sadahisa surrendered to Hōjō Ujitsuna after the victory of Hōjō Ujitsuna in the Battle of Kōnodai, and Kashiwa Castle became a castle of the Hōjō.
- 1590 (Tensho 18) – Kashiwa Castle is attacked by Toyotomi Hideyoshi and falls due to the role of Odawara.
- 1596-1614 (Keicho era) – Tokugawa Ieyasu's vassal, Fukuyama Tsukisai, settles in Kashiwa Castle.

=== Edo period ===
- 1643 (Kanei 20) – The Hikimata Riverbank is opened.
- 1643 (Kanei 20) – Matabe Mikami becomes the first village head.
- 1644 (Kanei 21) – Mikami river merchant opens.
- 1656 (Meireki 2) – The Inoshita river merchant opens at the behest of Kawagoe Domain.
- 1662 (Kanbun 2) – Iroha Hi is erected on the Shingashi River by Takezaemon Shirai, a vassal of the hatamoto Okabe Tadanao.
- 1784 (Tenmei 4) – Four river merchants, Mikami Shichirou, Inoshita Tozaemon, Nishikawa Takezaemon, and Ibei (surname unknown) are active.
- 1864 (Genji 1) – Three river merchants, including Mikami Shichirou, Inoshita Tozaemon, and Nishikawa Shigegoro, are active.

=== Meiji and Taisho era ===
- 1869 (Meiji 2) – Hikimata and Tate are under the jurisdiction of the Takasaki clan, and Muneoka is under the jurisdiction of the Maebashi clan and Shinagawa prefecture.
- 1871 (Meiji 4) – By the abolition of the feudal clan, Iruma prefecture belongs to Hikimata, Tate, and Muneoka.
- June 1872 (Meiji 5) – Fujizuka (Tagoyama Fuji) is built at Shikishima Shrine in Honmachi, with Shokichi Takasu as the founder.
- 1873 (Meiji 6)
  - Belongs to Kumagaya prefecture.
  - The Hikimata Post Office is opened.
- 1874 (Meiji 7)
  - July-Elementary schools opened in the Shiki and Muneoka districts, and are called Shiki Elementary School and Muneoka Elementary School, respectively.
  - September-Hikimata Village and Tatemura merge to form Shiki Inn.
- January 1, 1875 (Meiji 8) --Became a post office. In the same year, the name was changed to Shiki Post Office.
- 1876 (Meiji 9)
  - August 21 – Both Shiki and Muneoka belong to Saitama Prefecture.
  - December 19 – Owada Police Station Shiki Branch is opened.
- 1876 (Meiji 9) – Fujizuka is built at Asama Shrine in Kamimuneoka.
- July 22, 1878 (Meiji 11) – With the enactment of the county, ward, town, and village organization law, it becomes Shiki-juku, Niikura-gun.
- 1880 (Meiji 13) – The warehouse is closed. A few years later, the Takasu Kairin store opens.
- April 1, 1884 (Meiji 17) – The Shiki Fire Fighting Group is established.
- April 1, 1889 (Meiji 22) – The town-village system was enforced, and Shiki-juku was changed to Shiki-cho, Niikura-gun.
- January 1, 1893 (Meiji 26) – Renamed to Muneoka Jinjo Elementary School.
- 1894 (Meiji 27) – The school building of Muneoka Jinjo Elementary School is newly built.
- 1896 (Meiji 29)
  - March 29 – Niikura-gun merges with Kitaadachi-gun, and Shiki-cho belongs to Kitaadachi-gun.
  - July 9 – Shiki Town Post Office (Post Office) opens.
- December 1, 1897 (Meiji 30) – The 85th National Bank opens a branch office in Shiki Town.
- April 1, 1902 (Meiji 35) – Renamed Shiki Hirotsugu High School.
- April 1, 1905 (Meiji 38) – Renamed to Muneoka Hirotsugu High School.
- 1913 (Taisho 2) – The Urawa Security Court Shiki branch office (registration office) is set up in the precincts of Hodoji Temple.
- 1914 (Taisho 3)
  - May 1 – Tojo Line opens between Ikebukuro Station and Tanomozawa Station, and Shiki Station is set up in Shiki Town.
  - The lamp comes on for the first time in Shiki.
- June 28, 1916 (Taisho 5) – Urawa—The shared bus opens between Shiki.
- February 1921 (Taisho 10) – Hosoda Sewing Girls'School (Hosoda Gakuen Girls' High School) is established.
- 1924 (Taisho 13)
  - May 15 – A shared bus opens between Tokorozawa.
  - The Shiki Town Hall is newly built.

=== Showa-Heisei era ===
- October 31, 1929 (Showa 4) – Souoka lock and wash dam are built.
- 1930 (Showa 5)
  - Iroha Bridge will be erected.
  - The completion ceremony for the Shingashi River repair work was held.
- 1931 (Showa 6) – The prefectural decree to suspend the passage of ships ends the transportation of the Shingashi River.
- 1936 (Showa 11) – Saitama Daiichi Airfield (later Urawa Airfield) begins construction.
- October 1937 (Showa 12) – Yasuzaemon Matsunaga establishes the "Toho Industrial Research Institute" in the town as a research facility of Toho Electric Power.
- 1939 (Showa 14) April 7 – Municipal Shiki Commercial School is established.
- February 11, 1944 – Shiki-cho, Kitaadachi-gun and Uchimagi-mura, Muneoka-mura, Iruma-gun and Mizutani-mura merge to form Shiki-cho, Kitaadachi-gun.
- April 3, 1945 – In an air raid during the Pacific War, the US Army B-29 dropped eight time bombs at 1-chome, Yukimachi. Later, it exploded and the main building and storeroom of a private house were blown away, and five people who had been evacuated to the air raid shelter were involved and died.
- 1947 (Showa 22) April 1 – Shiki Junior High School is opened in Shiki-cho.
- December 15, 1947 – Keio Veterinary and Animal Science College is relocated from Kawasaki City, Kanagawa Prefecture to Shiki Town.
- 1948 (Showa 23) April 1 – Shiki Town is separated and becomes Shiki Town, Muneoka Village, Mizutani Village, and Uchimagi Village before the merger (all in Kitaadachi District). The name of Municipal Shiki Commercial School was changed to Municipal Shiki High School. Renamed Keio Veterinary and Livestock College to Keio Agricultural High School.
- 1949 (Showa 24) March 29 – Abolished Municipal Shiki High School and relocated Shiki Junior High School to the trace.
- April 1949 (Showa 24) – The Shiki Public Hall is completed.
- 1951 (Showa 26) July 16 – Muneoka Public Hall is completed.
- August 11, 1954 – Prefectural road Niiza Kawagoe Line (commonly known as "defense road") is completed.
- May 3, 1955 – Shiki Town and Muneoka Village merge to form Adachi Town.
- 1957 (Showa 32) April 1 – Keio Agricultural High School is changed to a regular high school, and the name is changed to Keio Shiki Senior High School.
- 1960 (Showa 35)
  - Rikkyo High School will move from Ikebukuro to Niiza-cho, and the south exit will be opened at Shiki Station.
  - The earliest ambulance in Saitama prefecture.
- November 1964 – The Akigase intake weir by the Japan Water Agency is completed.
- 1965 (Showa 40)
  - The wildfire water near the market slope becomes a culvert and the road is expanded.
  - October 31-Shiki Telegram Telephone Office is opened.
  - December 16 – Kokusai Kogyo Bus Kawagoe Sales Office Shiki Branch Garage is opened in Oaza Shiki (currently 3-chome, Saiwaicho, Shiki City).
- 1967 (Showa 42)
  - June – Completion of the new Adachi-cho fire department building.
  - September 27 – Adachi Town Fire Department is established.
- April 1, 1968 (Showa 43) – Shiki Daini Elementary School is opened.
- April 15, 1969 (Showa 44) – The first nursery school is opened in Kashiwacho.
- 1970 (Showa 45)
  - October 26 – Renamed to Shiki City due to the enforcement of the city system. At the same time, the city emblem is enacted [7].
  - March 31 – The Souoka Water Purification Plant is completed.
- 1972 (Showa 47)
  - April 1 – The second nursery school is opened in Nakamuneoka.
  - May 31 – The current city hall is completed.
- 1973 (Showa 48)
  - April 1 – Muneoka Daini Elementary School and Shiki Daini Junior High School are opened.
  - November 1 – The town names of the Muneoka district become Kamimuneoka, Nakamuneoka, Shimomuneoka, and Muneoka.
  - November 25 – The 1st Industrial Festival will be held.
  - April 1, 1974 (Showa 49) – Saitama Prefectural Shiki High School opens. The third nursery school is opened in Yukimachi.
- 1975 (Showa 50)
  - April 1 – Shiki Third Elementary School and Muneoka Junior High School are opened.
  - April 11 – A big fire broke out in Honmachi 2-chome, affecting 141 people in 42 households (Shiki fire).
- April 1, 1976 – The fourth nursery school is opened in Shimomuneoka.
- 1977 (Showa 52)
  - April 1 – Souoka Third Elementary School is opened.
  - September 15 – Shiki City Shonen Nature House is completed in Minamimaki Village, Minamisaku District, Nagano Prefecture.
- 1978 (Showa 53)
  - April 1 – Shiki City Song is enacted. The first nursery school will be renamed Nakano Nursery School, the second nursery school will be renamed Kitami Nursery School, the third nursery ** school will be renamed Nishihara Nursery School, and the fourth nursery school will be renamed Bamba Nursery School.
  - May 1 – Citizens' Hall opens.
- 1979 (Showa 54)
  - February 9 – Health Center opens.
  - March 1 – The remaining town names in the Shiki area become the pavilion.
  - April 15 – Library and local museum are opened.
  - May 7 – Citizen's Emergency Hospital opens.
  - August – Moving into Shiki New Town begins.
  - November 8 – Yanasegawa Station on the Tobu Line opens and the west exit is established.
  - November 10 – Fire trucks (ladder trucks) will be installed.
- 1980 (Showa 55)
  - January 29 – Iroha Sluice Gate (formerly Muneoka Gate) is removed.
  - April 1 – Shiki No. 4 Elementary School and Mitsugi Nursery School are opened.
  - April 23 – Citizen's Gymnasium opens.
  - July 23 – The east exit is set up at Yanasegawa Station.
  - April 1, 1981 (Showa 56) – Souoka No. 4 Elementary School is opened.
- 1982 (Showa 57)
  - February 1 – Saitama Transport Branch Local Sawa Automobile Inspection and Registration Office is opened, and the jurisdiction is changed from Omiya number area to Tokorozawa number area.
  - April 1 – Muneoka Daini Junior High School is opened.
- 1987 (Showa 62) August 25 – Tobu Tojo Line and the former Keidan Subway Yurakucho Line (currently Tokyo Subway Yurakucho Line) start mutual direct operation.
- October 24, 1988 (Showa 62) – Shiki Post Office moves from Kashiwacho 4-chome to Honmachi 5-chome.
- 1990 (Heisei 2)
  - April 24 – Carp streamers are hoisted on the Shingashi River.
  - November 25 – The first concert of the Shiki Symphony Orchestra will be held.
- 1992 (Heisei 4)
  - March 13 – Yanasegawa Library opens.
  - March 25 – Part of the small diameter of the murmuring is completed.
- 1993 (Heisei 5)
  - March 16 – Kokusai Kogyo Bus Kawagoe Sales Office Shiki Branch Garage closed due to relocation due to the opening of Nishiurawa Sales Office.
  - August 19 – Ozumou Shiki place is held.
- March 15, 1994 – Disaster prevention administrative radio operation started.
- August 4, 1997 – Concluded an "Agreement on Mutual Support in the Event of a Large-Scale Disaster" with Tatebayashi City, Gunma Prefecture.
- February 24, 2000-The redevelopment building at the east exit of Shiki Station is completed.
- 2003 (Heisei 15)
  - April 1 – Iroha Yugakukan opens.
  - July 1 – Asahiya Baru Pharmacy in Honmachi is registered as a national registered tangible cultural property.
- 2005 (Heisei 17)
  - March 31 – LaLaPort Shiki closes.
  - August 25 – Mayor Akira Naganuma announces a state of financial emergency.
  - January 17, 2006 – The "Agreement on Cooperation in Food Supply in the Event of a Disaster" is signed with Yamazaki Bread Saitama No. 1 Factory.
- 2006 (Heisei 18)
  - April 1 – "Liberalization of choice to attend school at Shiki City Junior High School" begins.
  - July 1 – The Street Smoking Prevention Ordinance comes into force.
- 2007 (Heisei 19)
  - April 1 – Shiki Municipal Emergency Municipal Hospital is renamed Shiki Municipal Municipal Hospital and a rehabilitation department is established.
  - August 25 – Mayor Akira Naganuma declares a break from a financial emergency.
- 2008 (Heisei 20)
  - April 17 – The first pension special flight support counseling room in Japan will be established in the municipalities.
  - April 21 – Concluded "Agreement on Mutual Support in the Event of a Large-Scale Disaster" with Iizuna Town, Kamiminochi District, Nagano Prefecture.
  - June 14 – Tokyo Metro Fukutoshin Line opens. At the same time, mutual direct operation between the Tobu-Tojo Line and the Tokyo Metro Fukutoshin Line will begin.
  - October 3 – Population surpasses 70,000.
- March 11, 2011 – The tsunami caused by the 2011 off the Pacific coast of Tohoku Earthquake (Great East Japan Earthquake) reached the Akigase intake weir.
- July 30, 2013 – Concluded an "Agreement on Mutual Support in the Event of a Large-Scale Disaster" with Tonosho Town, Katori District, Chiba Prefecture.
- January 27, 2017 – Concluded a cultural and tourism exchange agreement with Fujiyoshida City, Yamanashi Prefecture.

== Government ==
Shiki has a mayor-council form of government with a directly elected mayor and a unicameral city council of 14 members. Shiki contributes one member to the Saitama Prefectural Assembly. In terms of national politics, the city is part of Saitama 4th district of the lower house of the Diet of Japan.

== Economy ==
Shiki has some light manufacturing, but is primarily a bedroom community for the Tokyo Metropolis, with over 35 percent of its workforce commuting to Tokyo daily.

== Education ==
Shiki has eight public elementary schools and four public middle schools operated by the city government, and one public high school operated by the Saitama Prefectural Board of Education. In addition, there are three private high schools.

== Transportation ==
=== Railway ===
Tobu Railway - Tōbu Tōjō Line

- Yanasegawa

=== Highway ===
- National Route 463

== Sister city relations ==
- Washington Court House, Ohio, United States

== Notable people from Shiki ==
- Ren Ayabe, professional wrestler
