= Hase-dera (disambiguation) =

Hase-dera (Japanese: 長谷寺) is a Buddhist temple located in Sakurai, Nara Prefecture, Japan. It can also refer to:

- Hase-dera (Kamakura) in Kamakura, Kanagawa Prefecture
- Iiyama Kannon in Atsugi, Kanagawa Prefecture
- Hase-dera (Nagano) in Nagano, Nagano Prefecture
