= Kiyomizu-dera (Isumi, Chiba) =

Buddhist temple in Isumi, Japan

- 清水寺
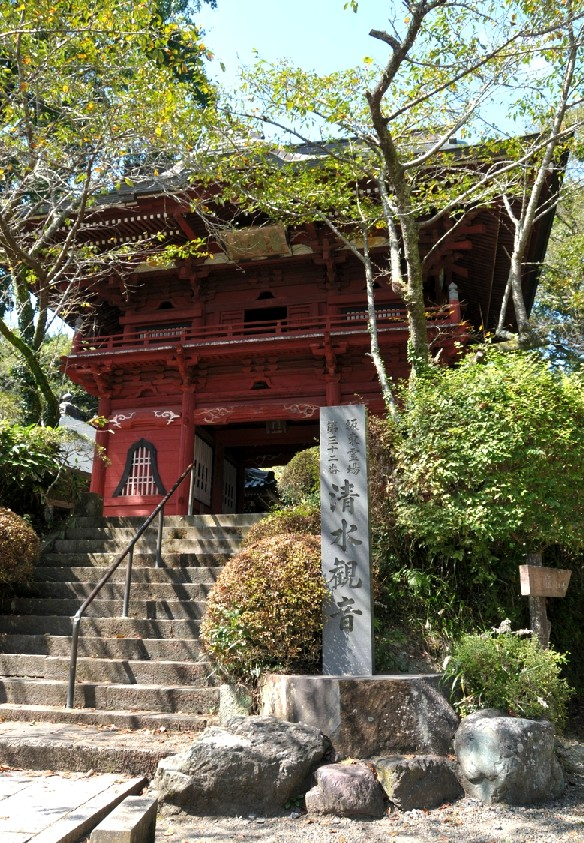
- Kiyomizu-dera Hondo

- Location within Chiba Prefecture Location within Japan

Religion
- Affiliation: Buddhist
- Deity: Senjū Kannon Bosatsu (Sahasrabhūja)
- Rite: Tendai
- Status: functional

Location
- Location: 1270 Kamone, Misaki-machi, Isumi-shi, Chiba-ken 289-0341
- Country: Japan
- Interactive map of Kiyomizu-dera
- Coordinates: 35°17′24.5″N 140°21′22.8″E

Architecture
- Founder: c.Ennin
- Completed: c.851

Website
- Official website

Kiyomizu-dera (清水寺) is a Buddhist temple located in the city of Isumi, Chiba Prefecture, Japan. It belongs to the Tendai sect and its honzon is a statue of Senjū Kannon Bosatsu ( Sahasrabhūja). The temple's full name is Otowa-yama Senjū-in Seisui-ji (音羽山 千手院 清水寺).The temple is the 32nd stop on the Bandō Sanjūsankasho pilgrimage route. It is also called the "Kiyomizu Kannon".

== Overview ==
The foundation of this temple is uncertain. According to the temple's legend, Kiyomizu-dera was founded in 807 when the priest Kūkai, during his visit to Katori Shrine, carved a small statue of Kannon Bosatsu holding a bamboo cane to provide blessings to children who were ill. The chapel to house the statue was located in a bamboo grove and was named "Chikurin-ji". However it burned down in 827 and the statue went missing. In 851, the priest Ennin was on a pilgrimage to Katori Shrine. When he entered the bamboo grove, five-colored clouds wafted above the bamboo bushes, which began to emit light. As he chanted the sutra, a maiden appeared from a well in the bamboo thicket, and when she made an offering to the bamboo shoots, the bamboo shoots opened and the Kannon statue appeared from within. The maiden then told him that she was the daughter of the dragon king, who had difficulty giving birth, and that if he would revive the temple, she would become its spiritual protector. Ennin then carved a larger statue of the Senjū Kannon, and placed the smaller statue within, and reconstructed a temple to house it.

The present Hondō (Main Hall), which according to temple legend, was originally constructed by Sakanoue no Tamuramaro, was reconstructed between 1688 and 1703.

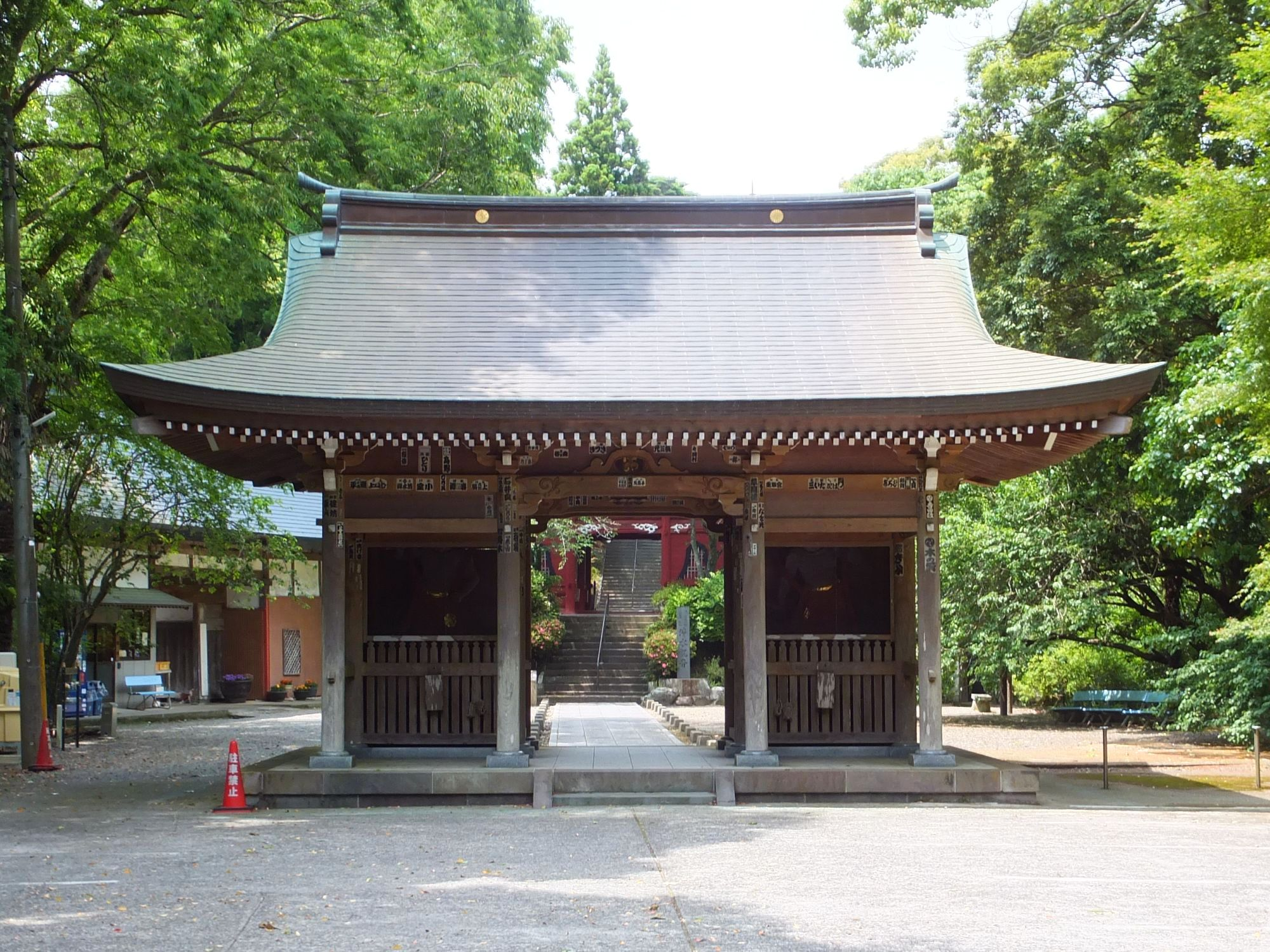
Niōmon

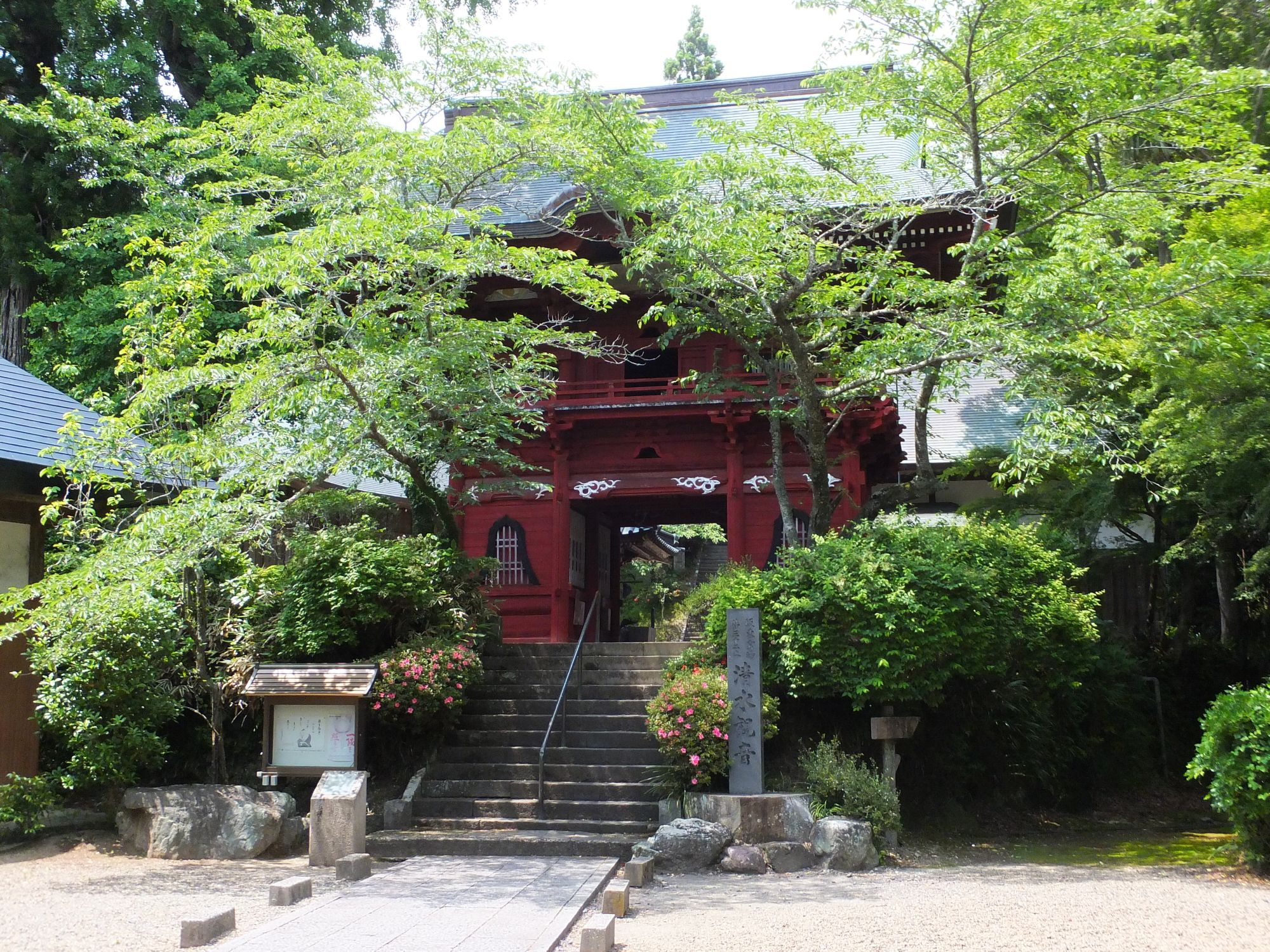
Shiten-mon

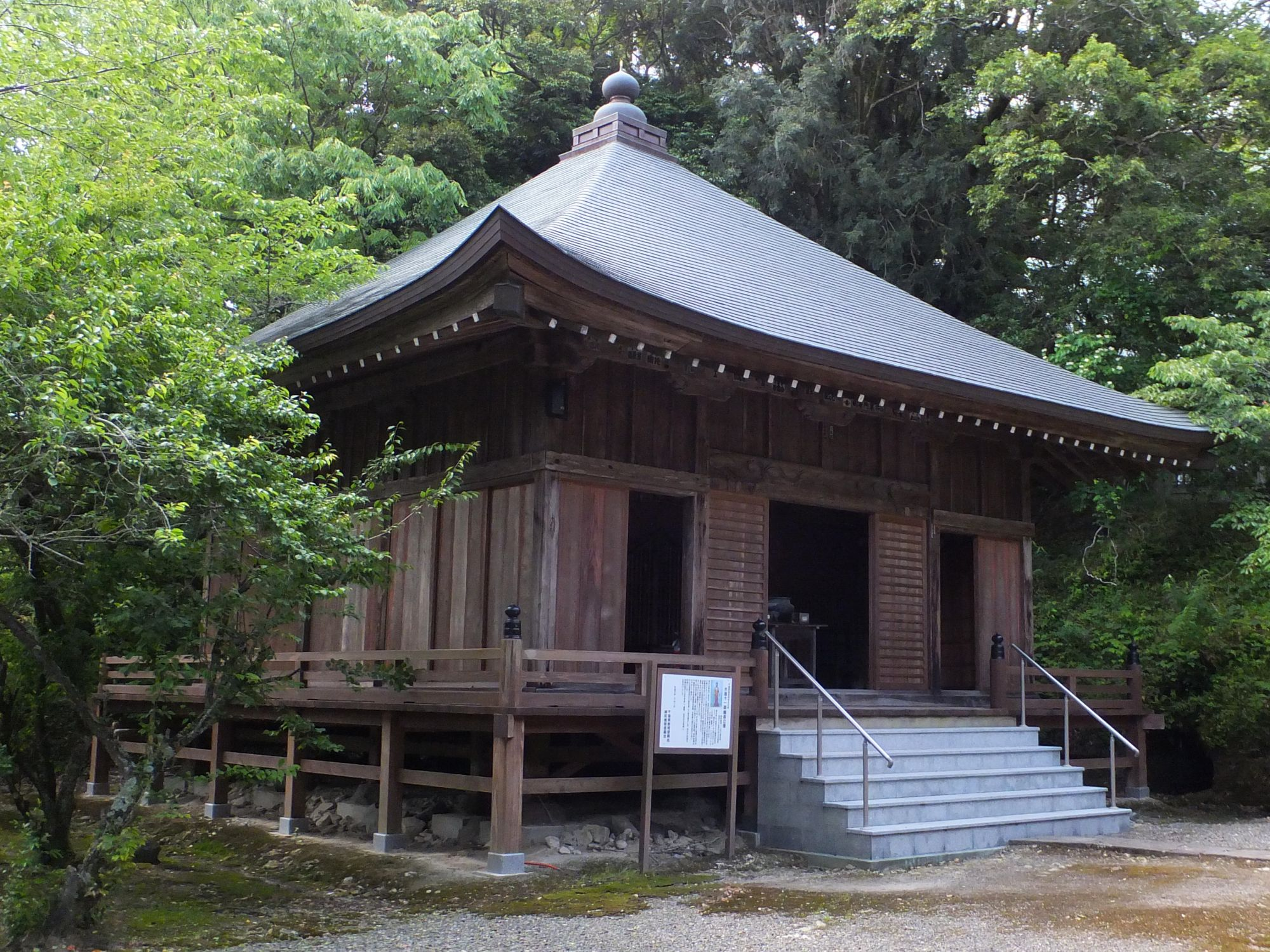
Okuno-in

== Cultural Properties ==
=== Chiba Prefectural Tangible Cultural Properties ===
- Wooden standing Jūichimen Kannon Bosatsu (木造十一面観音立像). Kamakura period. This statue is approximately 101-cm tall and is made in the yosegi-zukuri-style out of cypress wood. The head and body are made of separate materials. The head is carved from a single piece of wood, and then joined together in the front of the ears. The body is made of two pieces of hollowed wood joined together at the center of the sides. Both arms are made of separate materials from the shoulders, and the left and right arms are made of the same wood up to the elbows, and are joined at the elbows and wrists. The tips of both feet are also made of different material. It has a style similar to that of Kei school of sculpture, and is thought to be a work from the middle of the Kamakura period.

== Sources ==
- "Enpuku-ji". Nihon Rekishi Chimei Taikei (日本歴史地名大系 “Compendium of Japanese Historical Place Names”). Tokyo: Netto Adobansusha. 2010. Archived from the original on 2007-08-25.
- Chiba-ken Kōtō Gakkō Kyōiku Kenkyūkai. Rekishi Bukai. (1989). Chiba-ken no rekishi sanpo (千葉県の歴史散步 "A Walk of Chiba Prefecture's History"). Tokyo: Yamakawa Shuppansha. ISBN 978-4-634-29120-1.
