= Mangan-ji =

- 満願寺
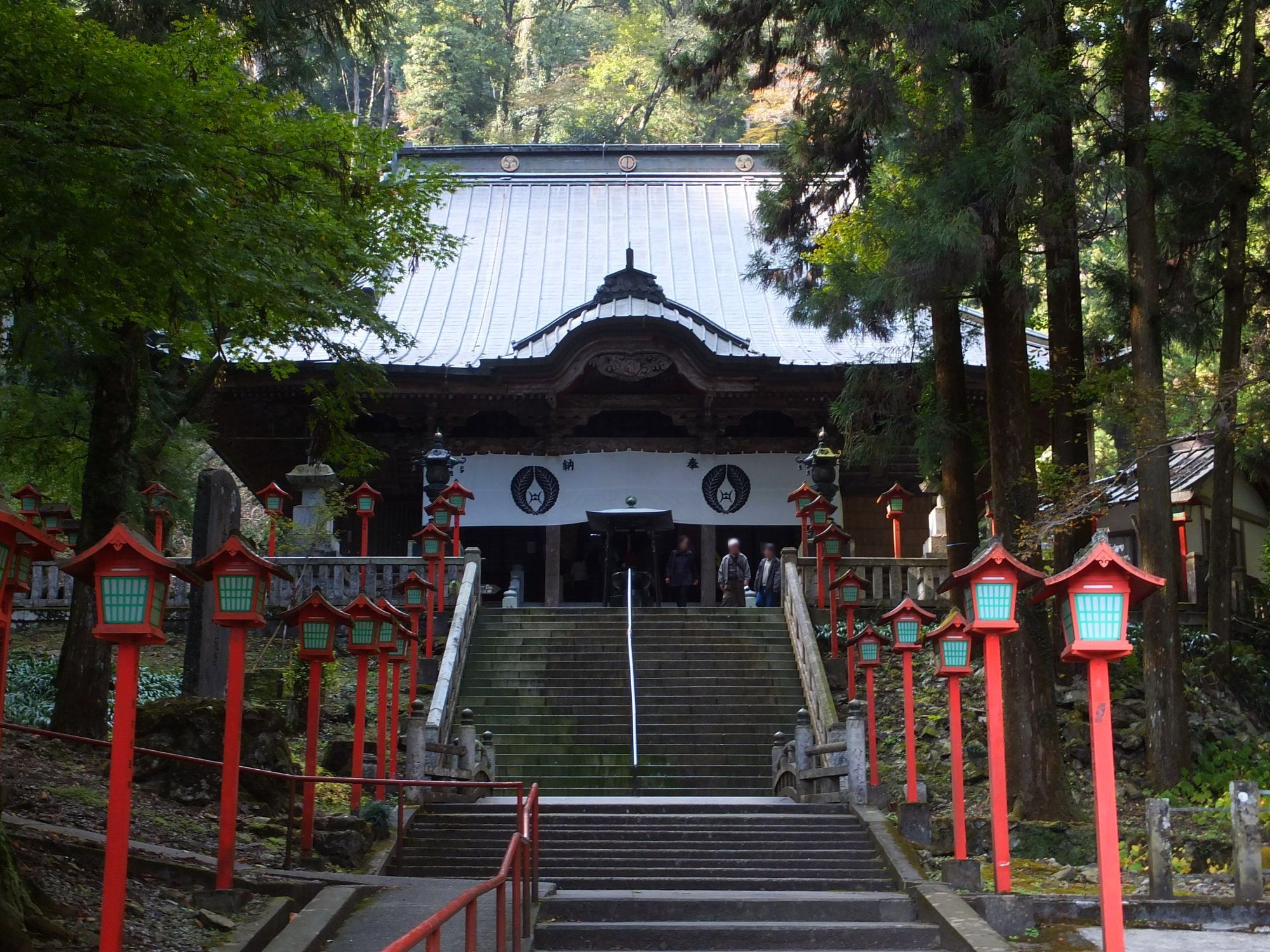
- Hondo

- Location within Tochigi Prefecture Location within Japan

Religion
- Affiliation: Buddhist
- Deity: Senjū Kannon Bosatsu ( Sahasrabhūja)
- Rite: Shingon-shū Chisan-ha
- Status: functional

Location
- Location: 288 Izurucho, Tochigi-shi, Tochigi-ken 328-0206
- Country: Japan
- Coordinates: 36°28′31.9″N 139°35′21.3″E

Architecture
- Founder: c.Shōdō Shōnin
- Completed: c.765

Website
- Official website

Mangan-ji (満願寺) is a Buddhist temple located in the Izuru neighborhood of the city of Tochigi, Tochigi Prefecture, Japan. It belongs to the Chisan-branch of Shingon Buddhism and its honzon is a statue of Senjū Kannon Bosatsu ( Sahasrabhūja). The temple's full name is Izuru-zan Senjū-in Mangan-ji (出流山 千手院 滿願寺).The temple is the 17th stop on the Bandō Sanjūsankasho pilgrimage route.

== Overview ==
The foundation of this temple is uncertain. According to the temple's legend, it was founded by either a priest named Shōdō Shōnin in the Tenpyō period (765). In 820, Kūkai visited the temple and constructed a statue of the Senjū Kannon using wood from the mountain.The temple was subsequently destroyed and rebuilt many times over its history. The current main hall, also called Ōmidō (大御堂), was built as a Kannon-dō in 1368 by Emperor Go-Komatsu with a donation from Ashikaga Yoshimitsu, but was destroyed by a fire in 1740 in which the temple was completely burnt down, leaving only the Niōmon gate. The current Ōmidō was rebuilt in 1764. In March 1864, the Main Hall of the temple, which housed a Dainichi Nyorai as its honzon, burned down, and the Ōmidō was designated as the new Main Hall. The Niōmon was built in 1735 and is a Tochigi city tangible cultural property. The Ōmidō is a Tochigi Prefecture Tangible Cultural Property.

In the Bakumatsu period, it was the location of the "Izuruyama Incident", one of a series of uprisings by pro-sonnō-jōi samurai throughout the Kantō region in 1867 intending to provoke the Tokugawa shogunate as a precursor to the Boshin War. The 50-60 samurai were led by samurai from Satsuma Domain and made the temple their headquarters and training grounds; however, the rebellion was suppressed by overwhelming force by the Tokugawa shogunate after two weeks.

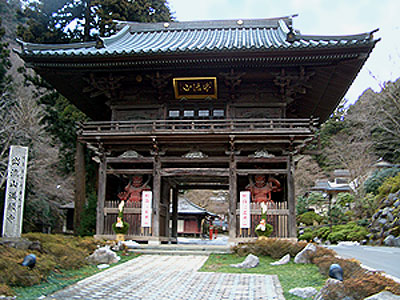
Niōmon

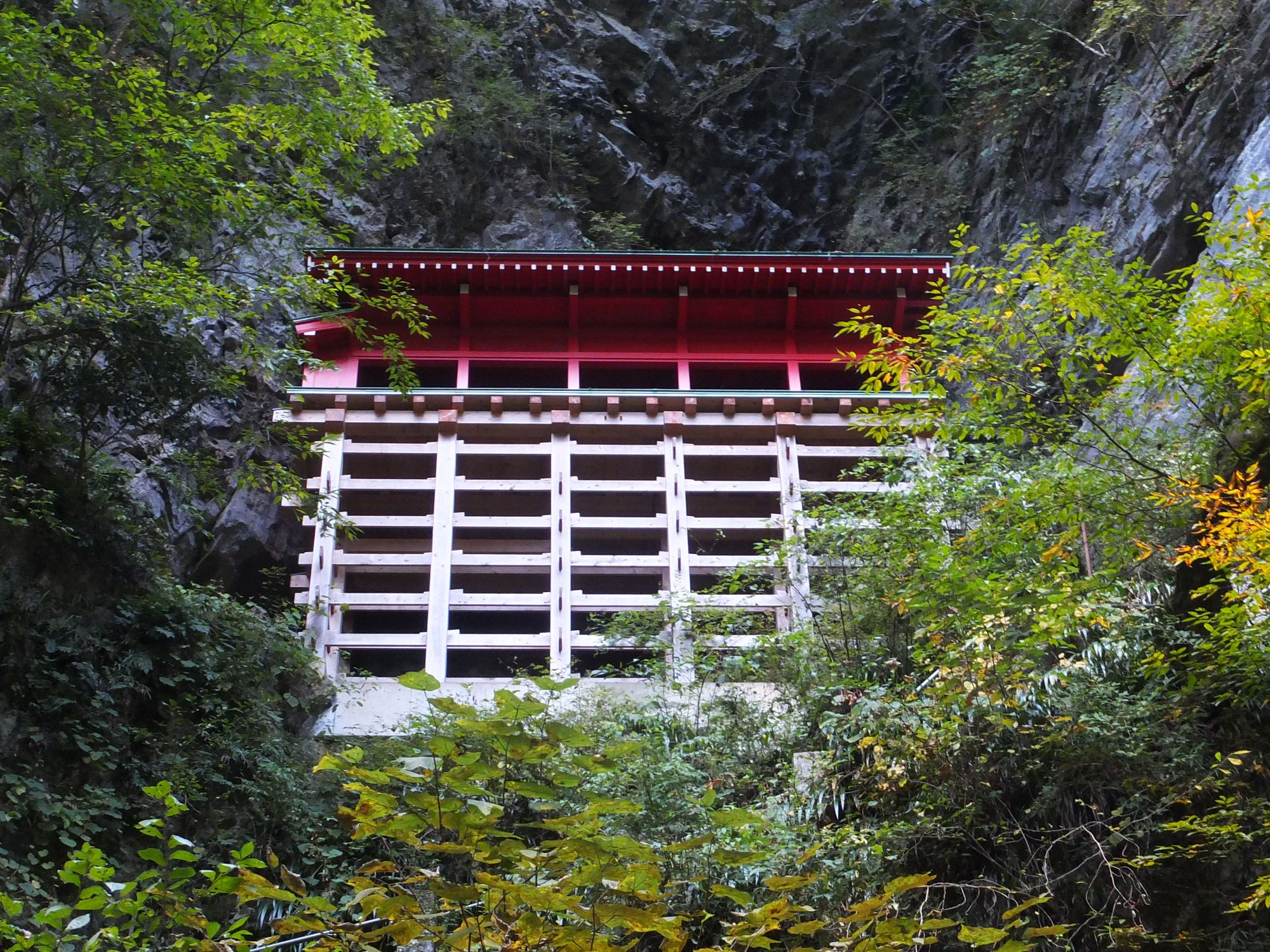
Oku-no-in

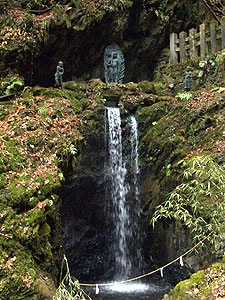
Waterfall

The temple is located approximately one hour by car from Tochigi Station on the JR East Ryōmō Line

== Tochigi Prefectural Tangible Cultural Properties ==
- Ōmidō (大御堂), Edo period, 1764. It is a gabled, copper-roofed structure measuring five bays on each side and featuring a three-bay porch. The interior is divided into an inner and outer sanctuary, but the outer sanctuary originally had an open ceiling, and investigation of the remains has revealed that there was once a lattice door separating the inner and outer sanctuaries. The lattice window on the side of the inner sanctuary may also have originally been a wooden wall.

== Tochigi City Tangible Cultural Properties ==
- Niōmon (仁王門), Edo period, 1735
