= Chōkoku-ji =

Buddhist temple in Gunma Prefecture, Japan

Chōko-ji
- 長谷寺
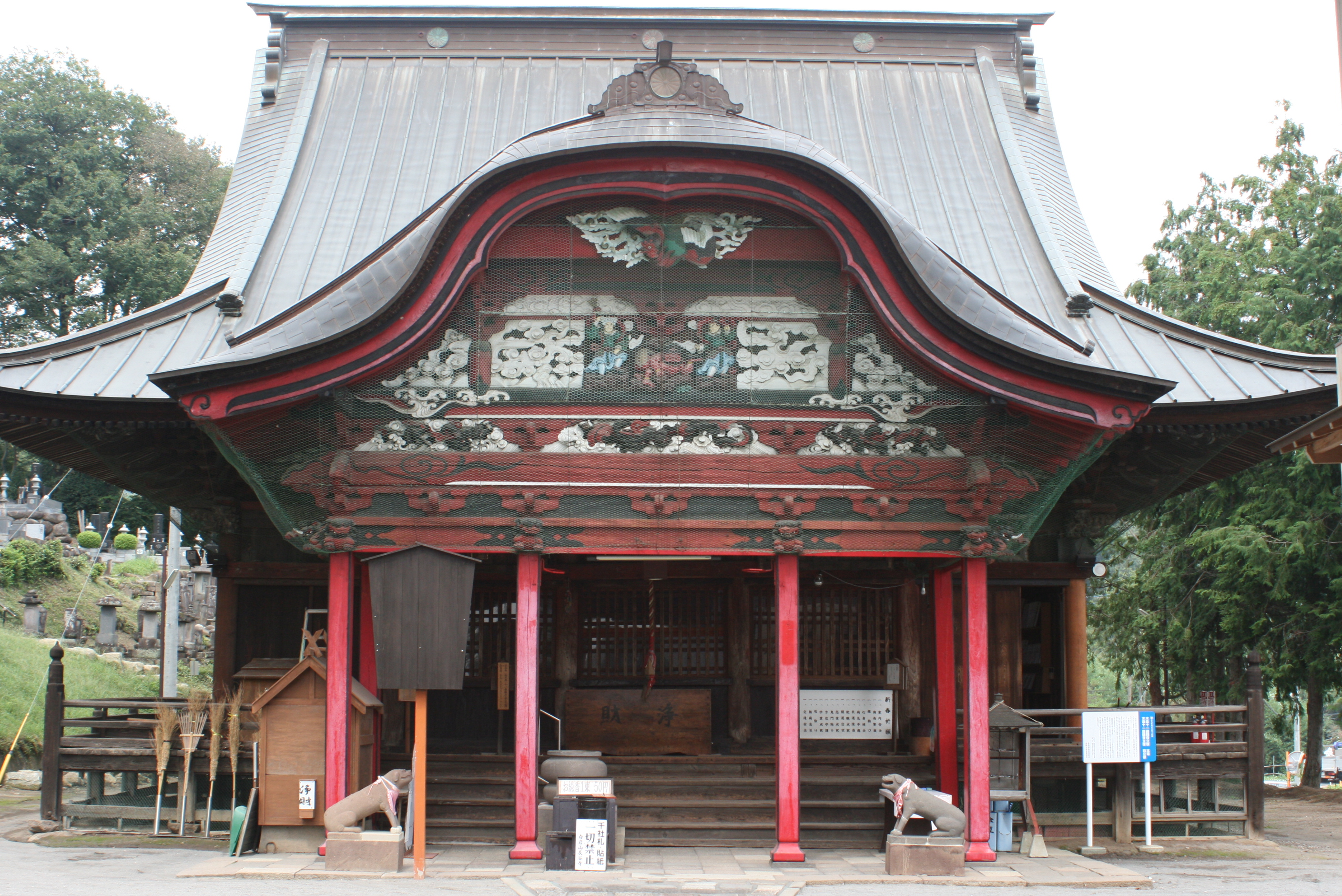
- Chōko-ji Hondō

- Location within Gunma Prefecture Location within Japan

Religion
- Affiliation: Buddhist
- Deity: Jūichimen Kannon Bosatsu
- Rite: Kinpusen Shugen Hon-kyō
- Status: functional

Location
- Location: 3583 Shiraiwa, Takasaki-shi, Gunma-ken
- Country: Japan
- Coordinates: 36°23′07″N 138°55′57.4″E

Architecture
- Founder: Tokudo Shonin
- Completed: c.Nara period

Website
- Official website

Chōko-ji (長谷寺) is a Buddhist temple located in the Shiraiwa neighborhood of the city of Takasaki, Gunma Prefecture, Japan. It belongs to the Kinpusen Shugen Hon-kyō sect of Japanese Buddhism and its honzon is a statue of Jūichimen Kannon Bosatsu. The temple's full name is Shiraiwa-san Chōko-ji (白岩山 長谷寺).The temple is the 15th stop on the Bandō Sanjūsankasho pilgrimage route.

== Overview ==
Details surrounding the founding of this temple are uncertain. According to the temple's legend, it was founded by either a priest named Tokudō (who is credited with carving the Kannon images under the name Hase-dera, written with the same kanji as Hase-Dera temple), or by the ascetic monk En no Gyōja, with Gyōki having carved its Jūichimen Kannon statue. As if to cover all bases, it is also said that both Saichō and Kūkai visited the temple.

What is certain is that the temple enjoyed the patronage of the Minamoto clan from the Kamakura period, and although it was destroyed by various disasters on many occasions, it was rebuilt with the assistance of the Nitta clan, Uesugi clan and others.

In 1566, during the wars of the Sengoku period, it was destroyed by the armies of Takeda Shingen when he attacked Minowa Castle. It was reconstructed by 1580.

The temple had been a center for Shugendō since its foundation, but when Shugendō fell from official favor in the Meiji period, the temple briefly came under the Tendai sect. It joined the modern incarnation of Shugendō headed by Kinpusen-ji in Yoshino, Nara, after World War II.

== Bandō Sanjūsankasho (Bandō 33 temple pilgrimage) ==
The temple is the 15th temple on the 33 temple Bandō Sanjūsankasho pilgrimage route.

== Access ==
The temple is located approximately one hour by car from Tochigi Station on the JR East Ryōmō Line

== Cultural Properties ==
=== Gunma Prefectural Important Cultural Properties ===
- Wooden standing Jūichimen Kannon Statuell (木造十一面観音立像), honzon, Heian period, 186-cm tall.
- Wooden standing Jūichimen Kannon Statuell (木造十一面観音立像), maedachi, Kamakura period, 185-cm tall.

== Bibliography ==
- Gumma-ken kotogakko kyoiku kenkyukai (2005). Gemma-ken no rekishi sampo. Yamakawa Shuppan. p. 75. ISBN 978-4-634-24610-2.
