= Ganden-ji =

Buddhist temple in Zushi, Kanagawa, Japan

- 岩殿寺
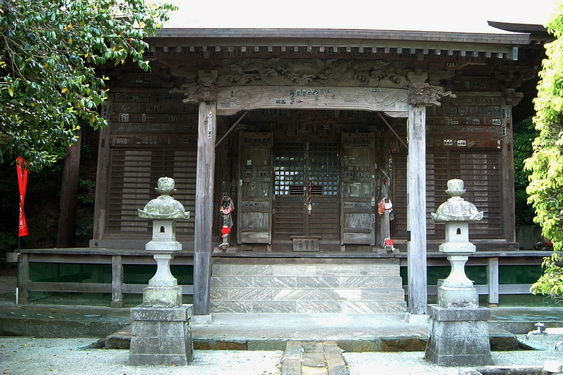
- Ganden-ji Kannon-dō

- Location within Kanagawa Prefecture Location within Japan

Religion
- Affiliation: Buddhist
- Deity: Jūichimen Kannon Bosatsu
- Rite: Sōtō
- Status: functional

Location
- Location: 5 Chome-7-11 Hisagi, Zushi-shi, Kanagawa-ken 249-0001
- Country: Japan
- Interactive map of Ganden-ji
- Coordinates: 35°18′18.2″N 139°34′20.3″E

Architecture
- Founder: unknown
- Completed: unknown

Ganden-ji (岩殿寺) is a Buddhist temple located in the Hisagi neighborhood of the city of Zushi, Kanagawa Prefecture, Japan. It belongs to the Sōtō school of Japanese Zen and its honzon is a statue of Jūichimen Kannon Bosatsu. The temple's full name is Kaiun-san Gokoku-in Ganden-ji (海雲山 護國院 岩殿寺).The temple is the 2nd stop on the Bandō Sanjūsankasho pilgrimage route. It is also called the "Iwadono Kannon", as the main hall of the temple abuts a cliff with a shallow cave, containing a chapel with a stone image of Kannon Bosatsu.

== Overview ==
The foundation of this temple is uncertain. According to the temple's legend, it was founded by the priest Tokudo in 721, and later Gyōki made a statue of Kannon Bostasu which he enshrined here. The Azuma Kagami records visits by Minamoto no Yoritomo, Hōjō Masako and Minamoto no Sanetomo and other important personages in the Kamakura period. It later declined, but received an estate for its upkeep by Tokugawa Ieyasu in 1591. It was supported by the local magistrate Hasegawa Nagatsuna, who changed its affiliation from the Shingon sect to the Sōtō school and its sangō from Kaizen-san (海前山) to Kaiun-zan (海雲山). It again declined in the Meiji period due to the anti-Buddhist Haibutsu kishaku movement . Ganden-ji is associated with the famed haiku poet, Kyōka Izumi, who resided for a time at the temple.

The temple is located a 17-minutes walk from Zushi Station on the JR East Yokosuka Line.

== Cultural Properties ==
=== Zushi City Tangible Cultural Properties ===
- Kannon-dō (観音堂); The current structure is thought to have been rebuilt in 1728 due to its style and ridge plate.
