= Jion-ji =

Buddhist temple in Saitama city, Japan

- 慈恩寺
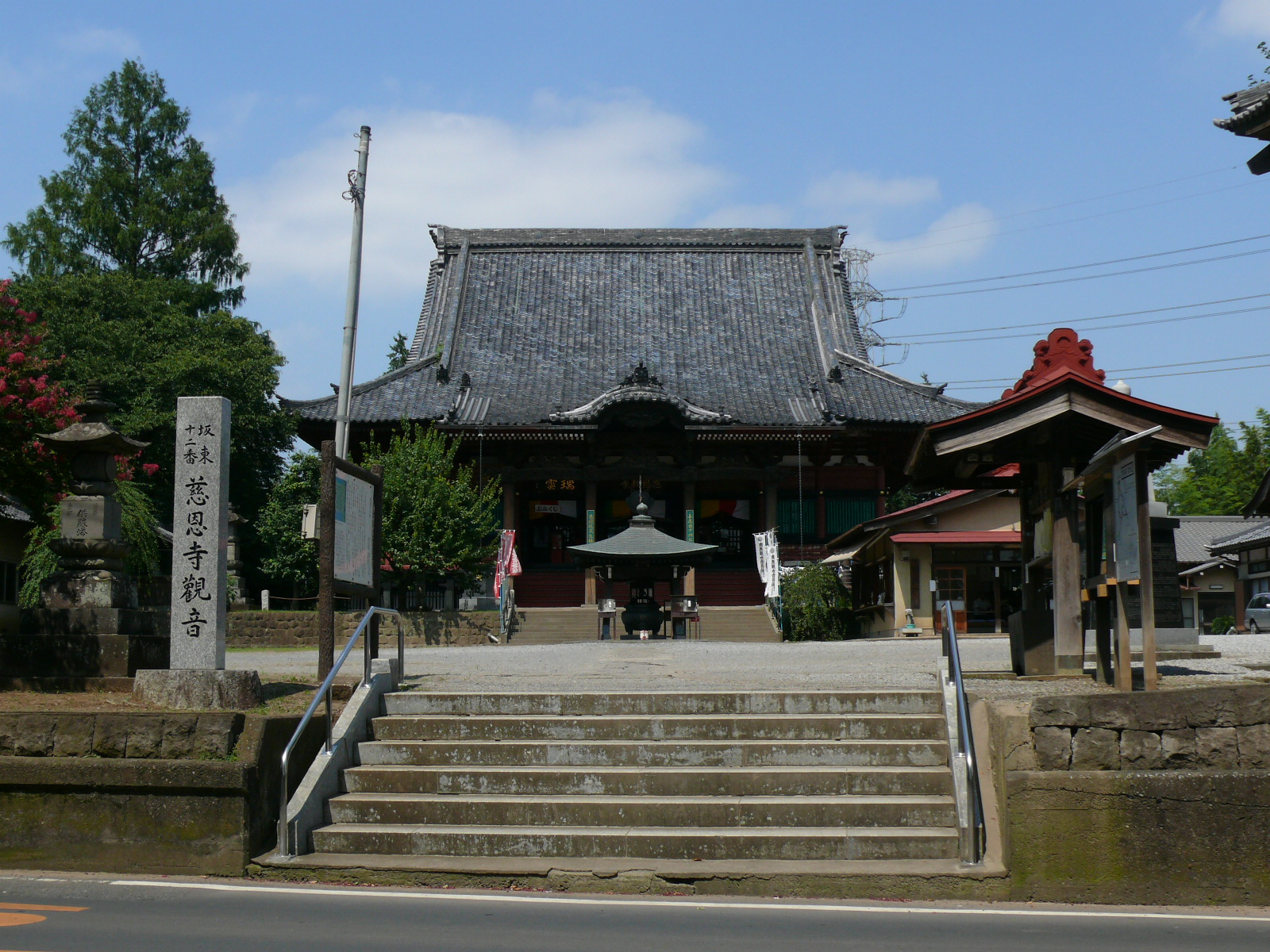
- Jion-ji Hondo

- Location within Saitama city Location within Saitama Prefecture Location within Japan

Religion
- Affiliation: Buddhist
- Deity: Senjū Kannon Bosatsu (Sahasrabhūja)
- Rite: Tendai
- Status: functional

Location
- Location: 139 Jionji, Iwatsuki-ku, Saitama-ken, 339-0009
- Country: Japan
- Coordinates: 35°58′33.95″N 139°42′42.1″E

Architecture
- Founder: c.Ennin
- Completed: c.Tenchō period (824-834)

Website
- Official website

Jion-ji (慈恩寺) is a Buddhist temple located in the Iwatsuki neighborhood of the city of Saitama, Saitama Prefecture, Japan. It belongs to the Tendai sect and its honzon is a statue of Senjū Kannon Bosatsu (Sahasrabhūja). The temple's full name is Karin-zan Saijō-in Jion-ji (華林山 最上院 慈恩寺).The temple is the 12th stop on the Bandō Sanjūsankasho pilgrimage route.

== History ==
Details regarding the founding of this temple are uncertain. According to the temple's legend, it was founded by the priest Ennin in the Tenchō period (824-834).

Per documents dated 1589, the lord of Iwatsuki Castle, Ōta Sukemasa added 24 hermitages to the existing 43 hermitages at the temple, indicating that it was an important temple at the time. In 1590, Tokugawa Ieyasu granted the temple estates of 100 koku for its upkeep, and the temple also received the patronage of the daimyō of Iwatsuki Domain.

During the Second Sino-Japanese War, while the occupying Japanese Imperial Army was digging to establish a Shinto shrine in Nanjing, tomb of Xuanzang, the Tang dynasty Buddhist scholar, monk and translator who had brought Buddhist texts from India to China was discovered. This find, which was jointly confirmed by Chinese and Japanese scholars, had been transferred in 1027 from Changan to this location. The finds were turned over to the Reorganized National Government of the Republic of China; however, for "safety from the deteriorating situation of China", a portion of the head bones was taken to Japan in enshrined in Zōjō-ji. Due to the increasing danger from Allied air raids in World War II, the relics were subsequently moved to Jion-ji, which takes its name after a noted temple in Changan.

In May 1953 a 13-story granite pagoda, was erected on a hill 400 meters south of the main temple complex. In 1955, the Government of Japan returned a portion of the Śarīra to the Government of the Republic of China on Taiwan, where they are now enshrined at Xuanzang Temple in Sun Moon Lake.

In 1980, the pagoda was dismantled and the relics were sent to Yakushi-ji in Nara as part of the ceremony marking that temple's reconstruction.

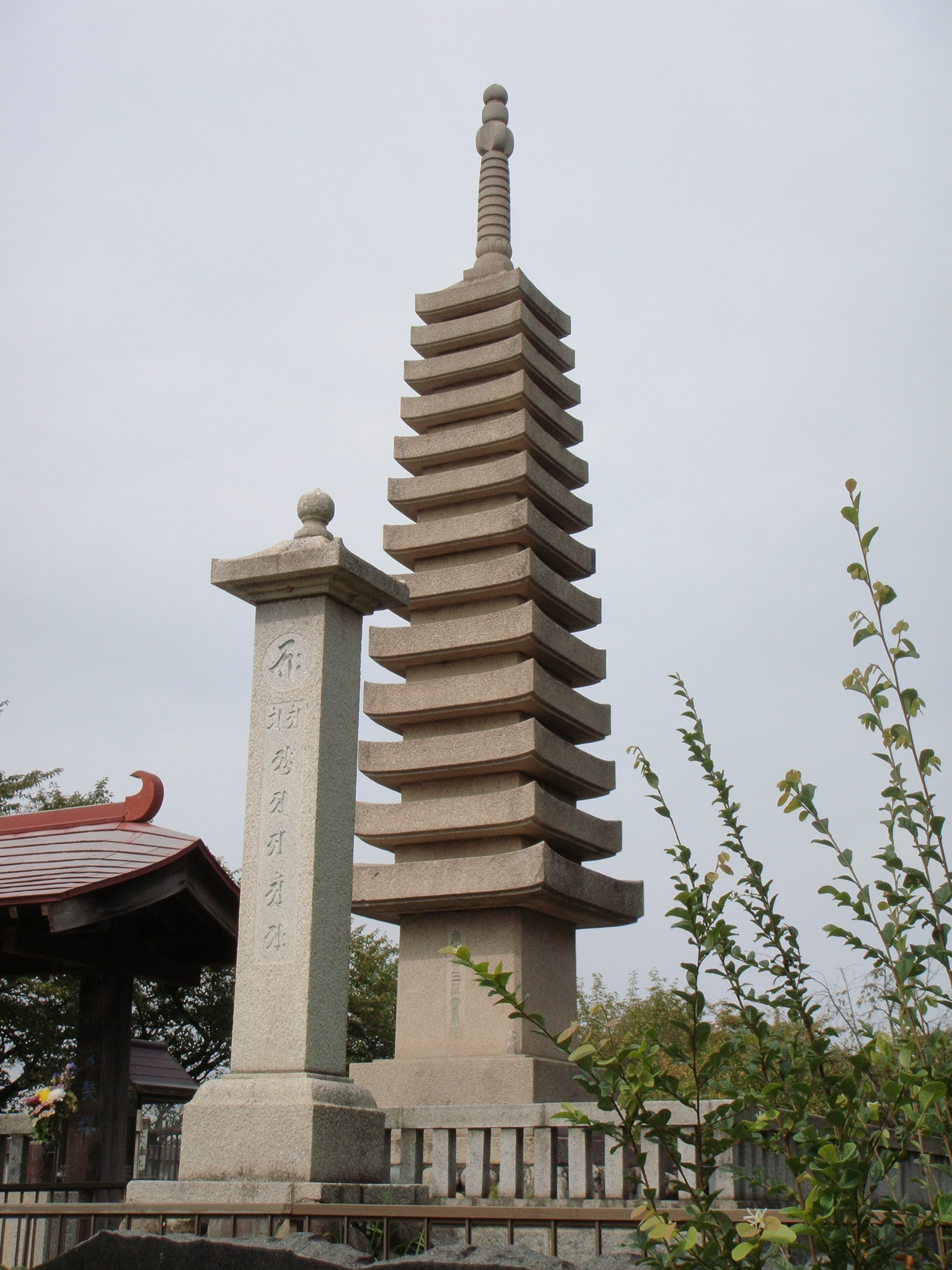
13-story Pagoda with relics of Xuanzang

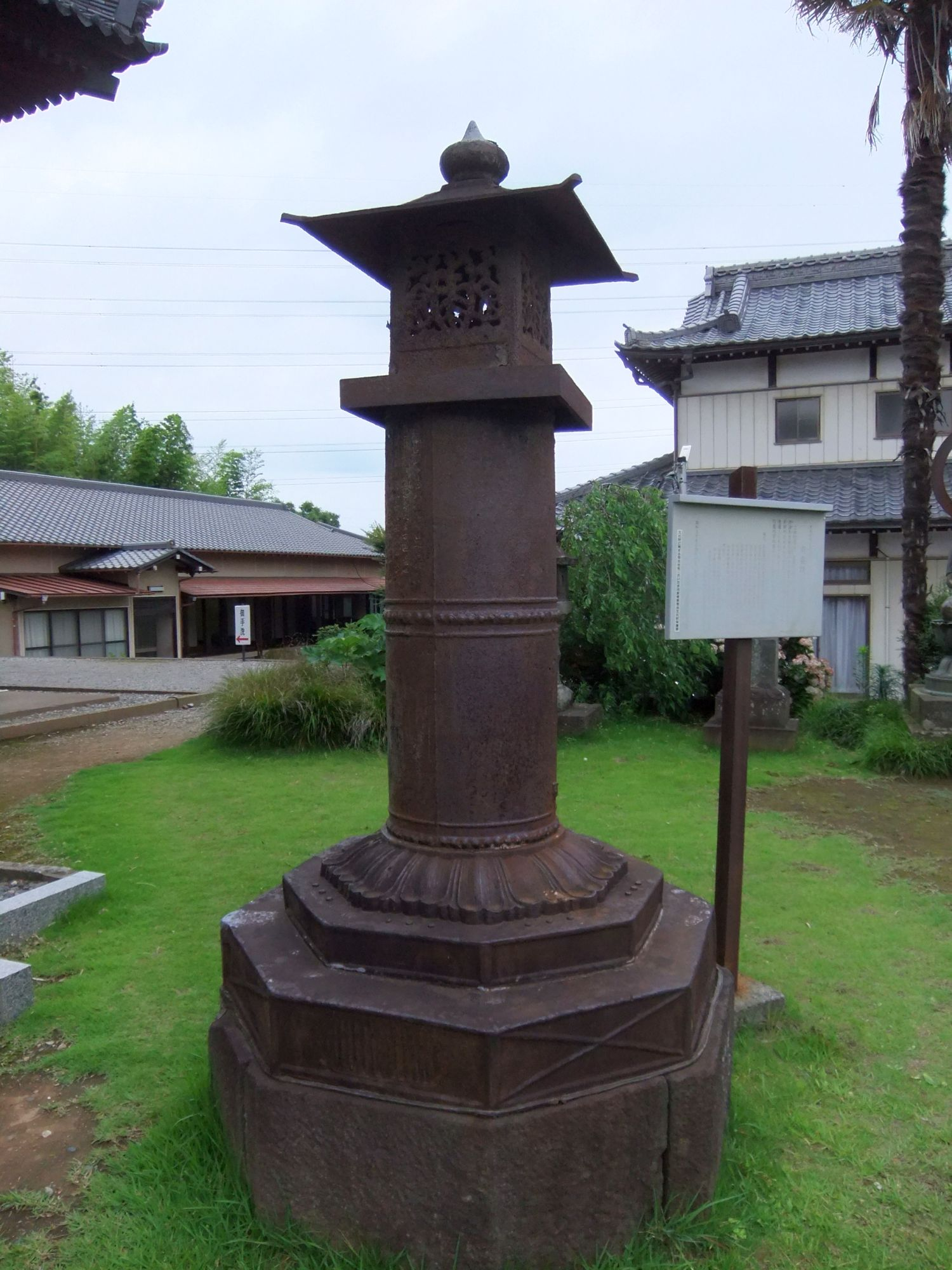
Iron Lantern

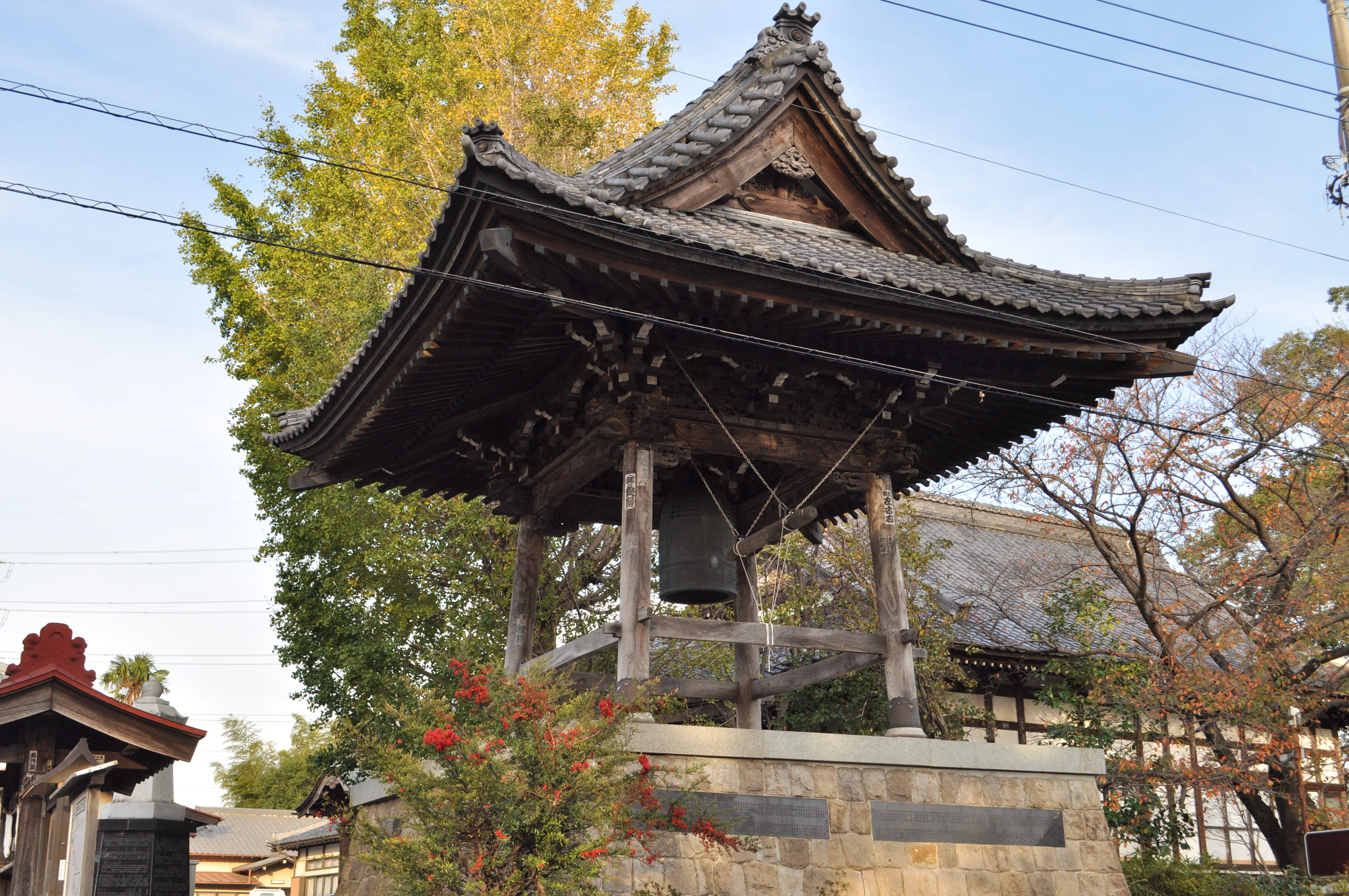
Bellfry

== Bandō Sanjūsankasho (Bandō 33 temple pilgrimage) ==
The temple is the 12th temple on the 33 temple Bandō Sanjūsankasho pilgrimage route.

== Access ==
The temple is located approximately a 25-minute walk from Toyoharu Station (Tobu Noda Line).

== Cultural Properties ==
=== Saitama Prefectural Tangible Cultural Properties ===
- Nanban Iron Lantern (南蛮鉄灯籠), Sengoku period, dated 1589, Nanban-style Tōrō
- Jion-ji Documents (慈恩寺文書), over 500 items, including a letter of donation from Ota Sukemasa, the lord of Iwatsuki Castle, dated 1549.
