= Rakuhō-ji =

Buddhist temple in Ibaraki Prefecture, Japan

- 楽法寺
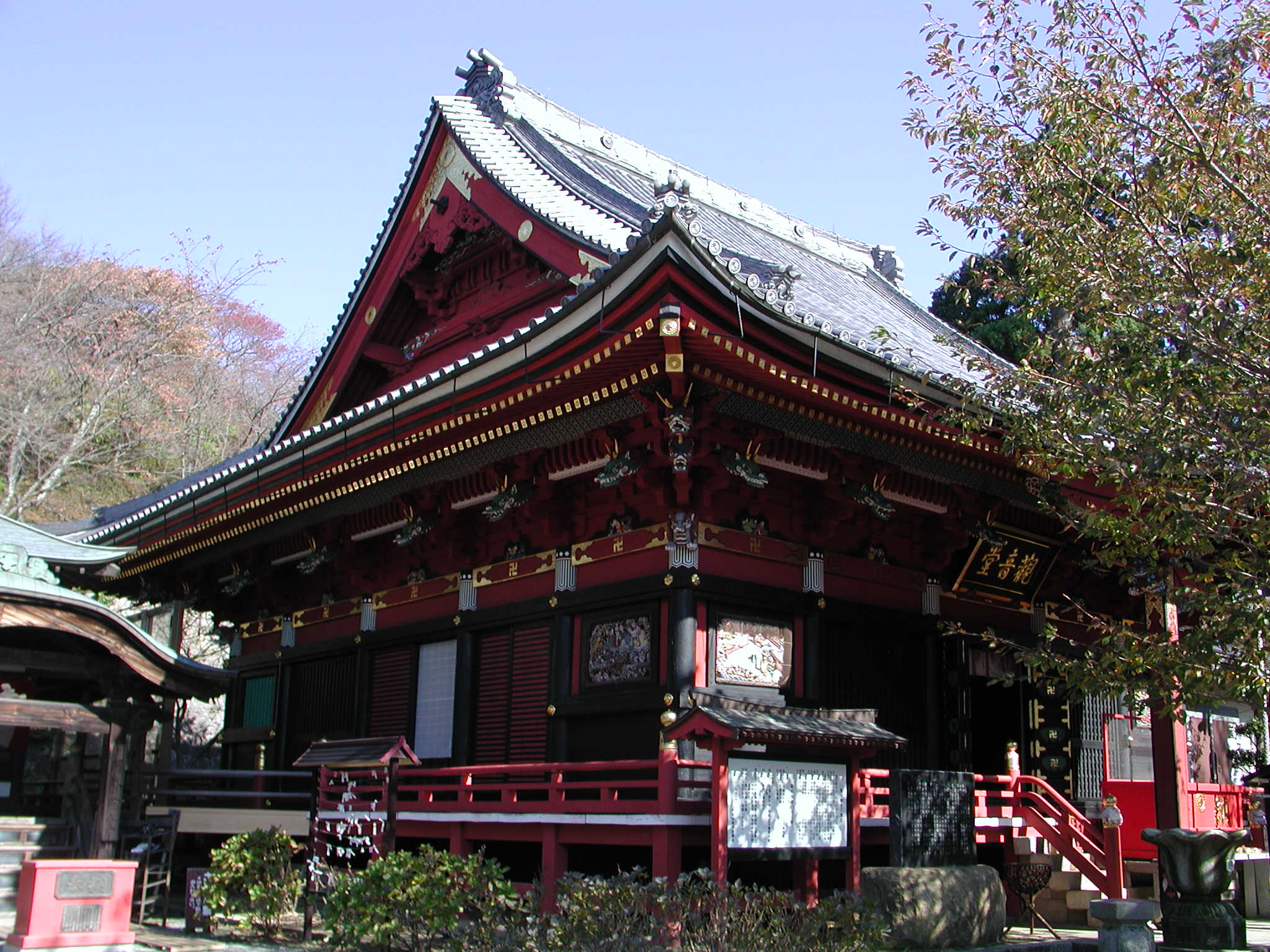
- Kannon-dō (Hondō)

- Location within Ibaraki Prefecture Location within Japan

Religion
- Affiliation: Buddhist
- Deity: Kannon Bosatsu
- Rite: Shingon-shu Buzan-ha
- Status: functional

Location
- Location: 1 Motoki, Sakuragawa-shi, Ibaraki-ken
- Country: Japan
- Interactive map of Rakuhō-ji
- Coordinates: 36°19′51″N 140°7′15″E

Architecture
- Founder: c. Horindoku
- Completed: c.587
- Important Cultural Property

Rakuhō-ji (楽法寺) is a Buddhist temple located in the Motoki neighborhood of the city of Sakuragawa, Ibaraki Prefecture, Japan. It belongs to the Buzan-branch of Shingon Buddhism and its honzon is a statue of Kannon Bosatsu named the Enmei Kanzeon Bosatsu (延命観世音菩薩), also popularly known as the Rain-bringing Kannon (雨引観音, Amebiki Kannon). The temple is the 24th stop on the Bandō Sanjūsankasho pilgrimage route.

== Overview ==
The exact circumstances surrounding the foundation of this temple are uncertain. According to the temple's legend, it was founded in 587 (the second year of Emperor Yōmei's reign) by a monk named Horindoku (法輪独守居士) from Liang dynasty China. When Emperor Suiko prayed for his recovery from an illness, it was found to be effective, so the temple became a temple of prayer for healing, and later Empress Kōmyō copied and dedicated a volume of her Lotus Sutra to pray for her own safe childbirth.

The temple's sangō of "Amebikiyama" was awarded by Emperor Saga in 821, who believed that praying for rain during a drought at this temple had a miraculous effect.

The Main Hall was rebuilt in 1254 by Prince Munetaka who was the sixth shōgun of the Kamakura shogunate, and again in the Kenmu era (1334–1338) by Ashikaga Takauji. It was reconstructed again in 1474 by local warlord Makebe Hisamichi and expanded by Makebe Harumichi, lord of Makebe Castle in 1526.

According to temple records, in 1683, the 14th abbot of the temple, Gyocho, attempted to rebuild the three-story pagoda by gathering good quality timber and building up to the second floor, but was unable to complete the project due to illness.The 15th abbot, Gyoshu, followed his predecessor's instructions but ran out of funds in January of the following year. However, miraculously, the main hall shook and the Kannon statue was spontaneously unveiled, causing crowds to gather for several dozen days, which provided the funds desperately needed to complete the construction.

In 1853, the two abbots, Motomori and Nobumitsu, joined forces to create a 100,000-person association, and the three-story pagoda was converted into a Tahōtō pagoda.

== Images of temple buildings ==
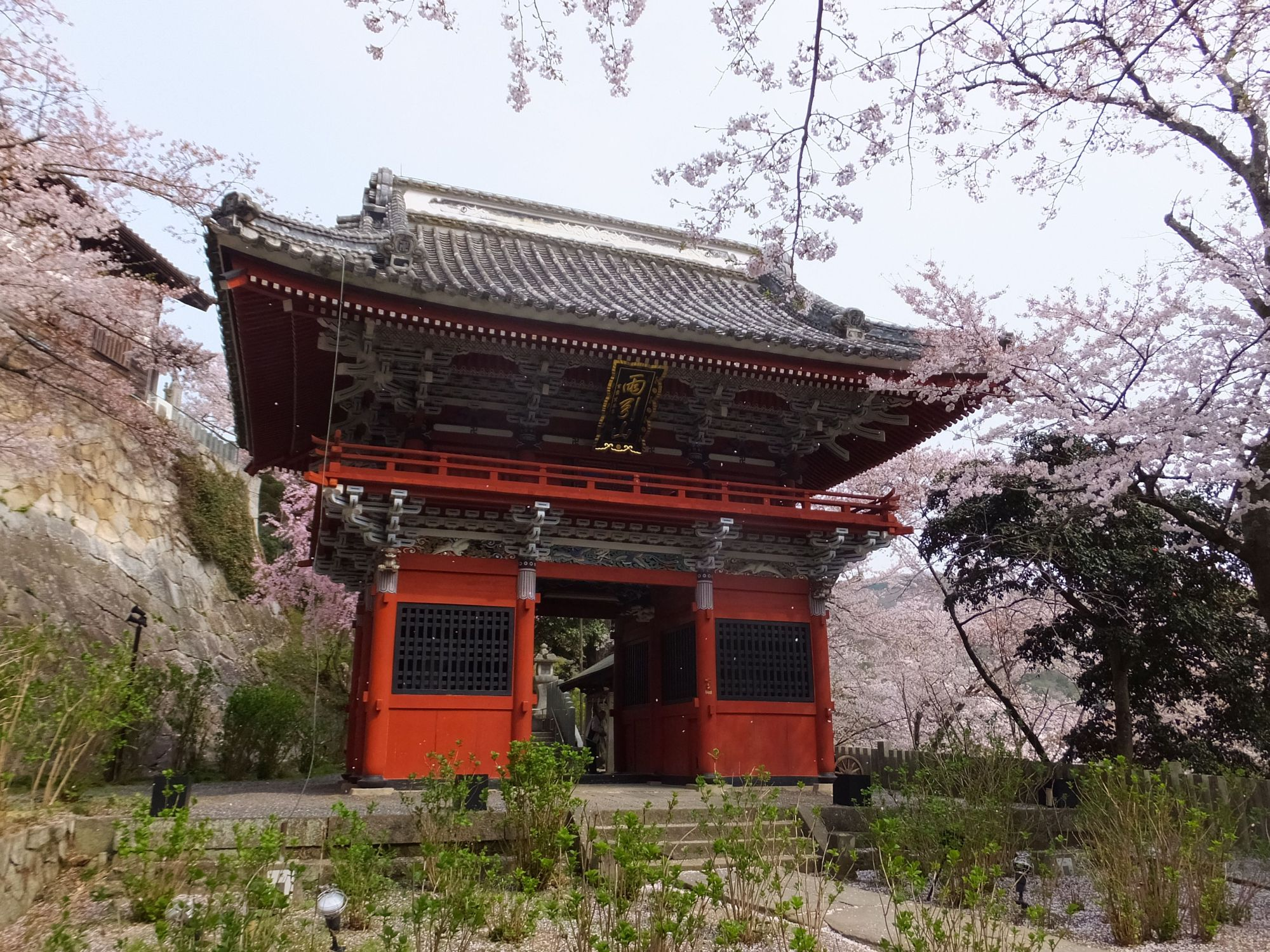
Niōmon

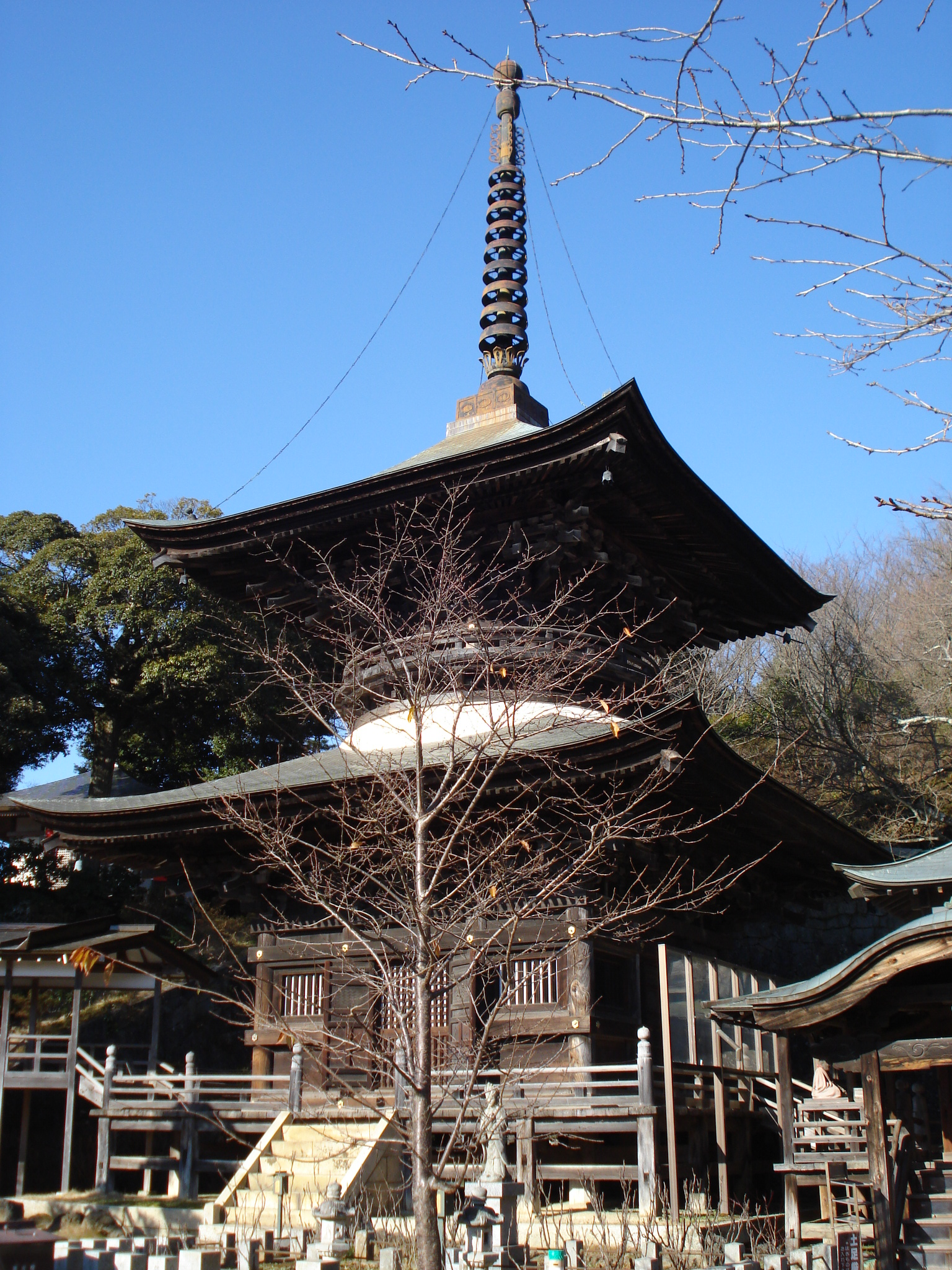
Tahōtō

== Bandō Sanjūsankasho (Bandō 33 temple pilgrimage) ==
The temple is the 24th temple on the 33 temple Bandō Sanjūsankasho pilgrimage route.

== Access ==
The temple is located 6.6 kilometers south, or approximately 12 minutes by car, from Iwase Station on the JR East Mito Line.

== Cultural Properties ==
=== National Important Cultural Properties ===
- Wooden standing statue of Kannon Bosatsu (木造観世音菩薩立像, Mokuzō kanzeonbosatsuryūzō), early Heian period. An iconographically unique statue of Kannon with eight arms, it is a hibutsu hidden image and is displayed to the public only on the first Sunday in April. It is accompanied by a non-hidden image displayed in front of the hidden statue. This is also part of the National Important Cultural Property designation.

=== Ibaraki Prefectural Important Cultural Properties ===
- Main hall (本堂), Edo period, Meireki era (1655–1658). It is a square 5x5 bay structure, with the two bays in the front serving as the outer sanctuary and the three bays in the back serving as the inner shrine
- Niō-mon (仁王門), Edo period, 1628; however, Niō statues within are claimed to date from the Kamakura period
- Tōshō Sannō Shrine (東照山王社殿), built in 1625 in commemoration of the 10th priest of the temple receiving an award from Tokugawa Ieyasu for participation in a debate held at Sunpu Castle; rebuilt in 1723.
- Tahōtō (多宝塔), Edo period, Kaei era (1848–1854)
- Aizen Myoo painting (絹本著色 愛染明王画像), Color-on-silk, Kamakura period
- Benzaiten painting (絹本著色 弁財天画像), Color-on-silk, Kamakura period,
- Eleven-faced Kannon painting (絹本著色 十一面観音画像), Color-on-silk, Kamakura period,
- Wooden statue of Fudō Myōō (木造 不動明王立像), Muromachi period, dated 1440
- Five-prong Vajra (五鈷杵（工芸品）), Heian period
- Great Prajnamaya Sutra (大般若経), Sengoku period. In both 1541 and 1546, Aki Iemiki, the lord of Makabe Castle in Hitachi Province, donated for the souls of his parents. Of the 600 volumes, over 490 are complete.
