= Shōfuku-ji (Kasama) =

Buddhist temple in Kasama, Ibaraki, Japan

- 正福寺
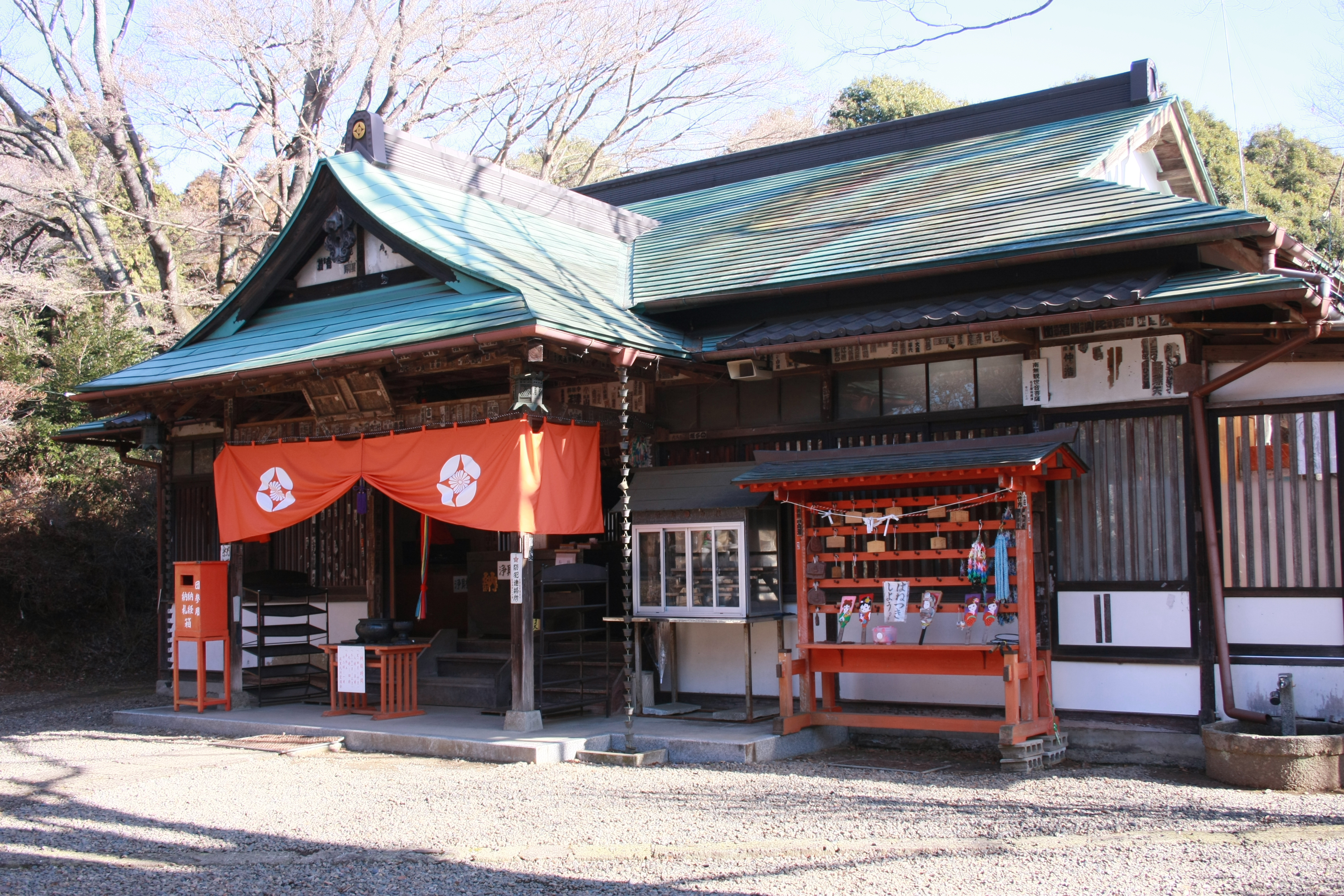
- Shōfuku-ji Hondo

- Location within Saitama Prefecture Location within Japan

Religion
- Affiliation: Buddhist
- Deity: Senjū Kannon Bosatsu ( Sahasrabhūja)
- Rite: Fumon sect Shingon
- Status: functional

Location
- Location: 1056-1 Kasama, Kasama-shi, Ibaraki-ken 355-0151
- Country: Japan
- Interactive map of Shōfuku-ji
- Coordinates: 36°23′10.7″N 140°15′34.6″E

Architecture
- Founder: unknown
- Completed: c. 651

Website
- Official website

Shōfuku-ji (正福寺) is a Buddhist temple located on Mount Sashiro in the city of Kasama, Ibaraki Prefecture, Japan. It belongs to the Shingon-shū Fumon sect and its honzon is a statue of Senjū Kannon Bosatsu (Sahasrabhūja). The temple's full name is Sashiro-zan Shōfuku-ji (佐白山 正福寺).The temple is the 23rd stop on the 33-temple Bandō Sanjūsankasho pilgrimage route. It is also called the "Sashiro Kannon".

== History ==
Details surrounding the founding of this temple are uncertain. According to the temple's legend, it was founded in 651 after a hunter sensed the presence of Kannon Bosatsu in a tree Mount Sashiro and carved a statue directly into the living wood.

Originally located near the summit of Mount Sashiro, the temple received a charter from Emperor Kotoku and at its peak it became one of the largest temples in the Kantō region, with over 100 monks' quarters.

In the Kamakura period, the temple came into conflict with Tokuzo-ji, a neighboring temple on Mount Nunobiki, another sacred mountain in the vicinity. The Utsunomiya clan, local warlords, attempted arbitration, but becoming frustrated with the intransigence of both sides, ended up burning down both temples and erecting Kasama Castle on Mount Sashiro. The temple was rebuilt within Kasama Castle as a place of prayer for the local Kasama clan.

During the Sengoku period, the Kasama rebelled again their overlords, the Utsunomiya clan, and refused to participate in Toyotomi Hideyoshi's Siege of Odawara (1590). The clan was destroyed and the temple went into decline.

During the Edo period, with the establishment of Kasama Domain, Shōfuku-ji was rebuilt within Kasama Castle and was were renovated during the Genroku era (1688–1704).

However, once the Edo period ended, due to the separation of Shinto and Buddhism and the abolition of Shugendō in the early Meiji period, the temple went into decline and was burnt down. Furthermore, due to the abolition of the han system Shōfuku-ji now longer had the support and patronage of the daimyō of Kasama Domain. Its honzon statue was sold to the private sector and other items that had been located with Kasama Castle, such as various Buddha statues were dispersed.

In the 1920s, a large-scale campaign for the reconstruction of the temple was held, and on April 15, 1930, a new hall was built at the current location, the Buddhist statues other than the honzon were relocated, and red seal stamps connected with the Bandō Sanjūsankasho pilgrimage were supported.

The newly built hall was called the "Sashiro Kannon-dō", but in 1983 it changed its name to "Kanzeon-ji", becoming an independent temple within the Shingon school. In 2012 it was renamed back to its original name of Shōfuku-ji.

== Bandō Sanjūsankasho (Bandō 33 temple pilgrimage) ==
The temple is the 23rd temple on the 33 temple Bandō Sanjūsankasho pilgrimage route.

== Access ==
The temple is located an approximately 25-minute was from Kasama Station on the JR East Mito Line.

== Cultural Properties ==
=== Ibaraki Prefecture Tangible Cultural Properties ===
- Wooden seated statue of Kanon Bosatsu (木造佐白観音（千手観音）坐像), mid-Kamakura period. This 58-cm image is made in the yosegizukuri-style with crystal eyes; however, the accompanying halo is older, and is believed to date from the late Heian period.

=== Kasama City Tangible Cultural Properties ===
- Bronze standing statue of Jūchimen Senjū Kannon Bosatsu (金銅仏十一面千手観音立像), Heian period, 7.7-cm. This tiny statue was located in the womb of the main image of Kanzeon-ji and was cast in gilt bronze by the lost wax process. Many of the hands protruding from the sides of the body show damage caused by fire during the early Kamakura period.
- Wooden standing statue of Fudō Myōō (木造不動明王立像), 102-cm. According to the ink inscription inside the statue, it was dedicated to Gokuraku-ji Temple in 1444, moved to Gensho-in in the early Meiji period, and when Sashiro Kannon-dō was built in 1930, was enshrined as a side attendant to the honzon statue. It was restored at the Nara National Museum in 1987.
- Wooden standing statue of Bishamon-ten (木造毘沙門天像), 110-cm. According to the ink inscription inside the statue, it was dedicated to Gokuraku-ji Temple in 1444, moved to Gensho-in in the early Meiji period, and when Sashiro Kannon-dō was built in 1930, was enshrined as a side attendant to a honzon statue. It was restored at the Nara National Museum in 1987.
