= Nichirin-ji =

Buddhist temple in Ibaraki Prefecture, Japan

- 日輪寺
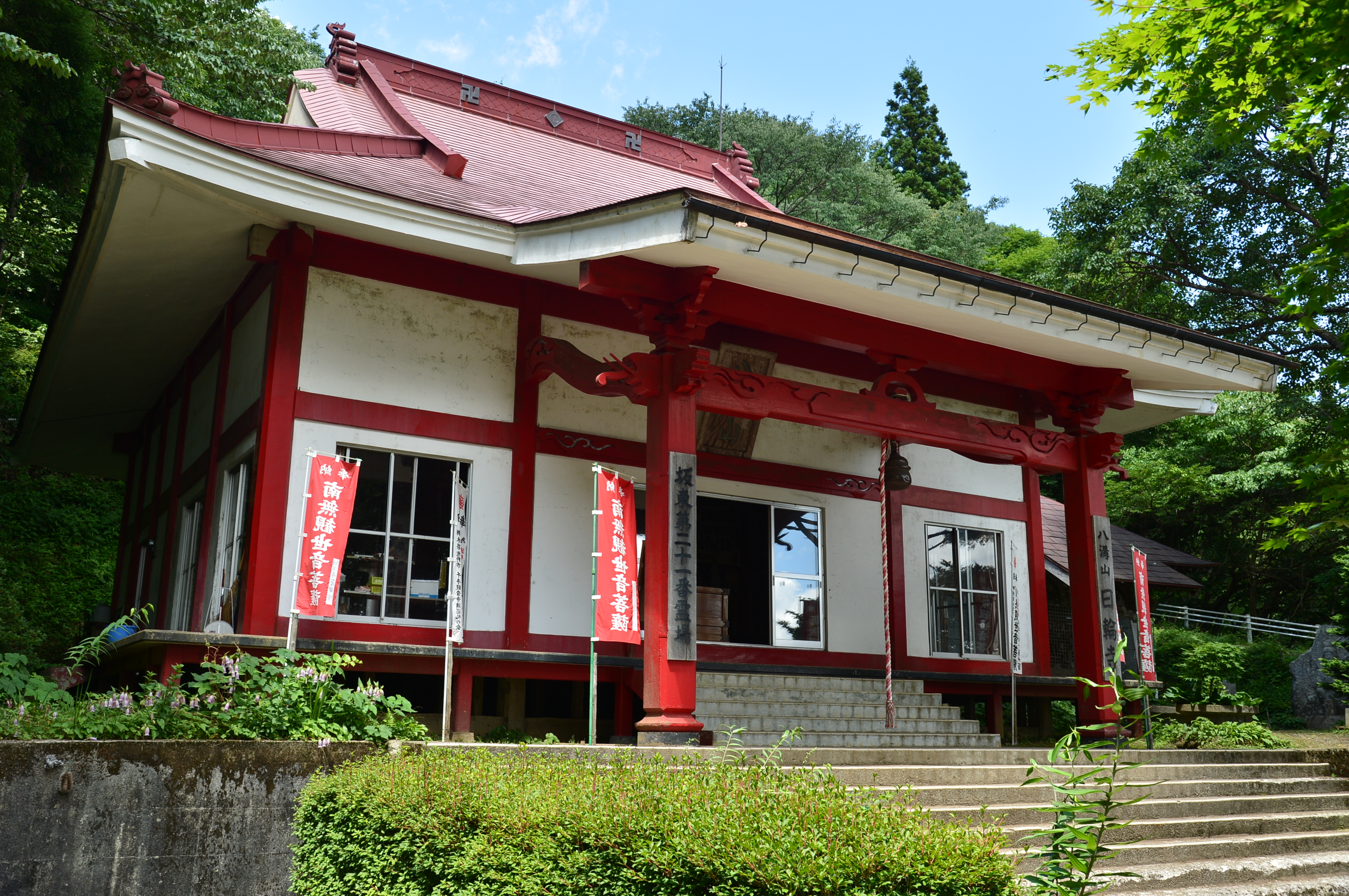
- Kannon-dō (Hondō)

- Location within Ibaraki Prefecture Location within Japan

Religion
- Affiliation: Buddhist
- Deity: Jūichimen Kannon Bosatsu
- Rite: Tendai
- Status: functional

Location
- Location: 2134 Uenonomiya, Daigo-machi, Kuji-gun, Ibaraki-ken 319-3704
- Country: Japan
- Interactive map of Nichirin-ji
- Coordinates: 36°55′16.3″N 140°16′25.4″E

Architecture
- Founder: c.En no Gyōja
- Completed: c.Hakuho period

Nichirin-ji (日輪寺) is a Buddhist temple located in the Uenonomiya neighborhood of the town of Daigo, Ibaraki Prefecture, Japan. It belongs to the Tendai school of Japanese Buddhism and its honzon is a statue of Jūichimen Kannon Bosatsu. The temple's full name is Yamizo-zan Nichirin-ji (八溝山日輪寺).The temple is the 21st stop on the Bandō Sanjūsankasho pilgrimage route.

== History ==
The details surrounding the founding of this temple are uncertain. According to the temple's legend, it was founded by the ascetic En no Gyōja in the Hakuho period (late 7th century).

The temple was later abandoned, and was restored in 807 by Kūkai, who installed a statue of Jūichimen Kannon which he had personally had carved. The temple was then rebuilt once more by order of the Cloistered Emperor Kazan in 989.

In the Heian period and Kamakura period, the temple became a sacred place mainly for ascetics and practitioners of Shugendō. It prospered in the Muromachi period, and in the Bunmei era (late 15th century), it is said to have had large main hall made of zelkova wood.

During the Edo period, the temple was destroyed by fire in 1643; however, with the assistance of Tokugawa Mitsukuni of Mito Domain, it was rebuilt by 1660. It declined again in the Meiji period due to the anti-Buddhist Haibutsu kishaku policies of the early Meiji government, and was completely destroyed in 1880 by a forest fire, with only the honzon statue surviving.

Currently, the temple consists of only the Kannon-dō chapel and a few other small buildings

== Bandō Sanjūsankasho (Bandō 33 temple pilgrimage) ==
The temple is the 21st temple on the 33 temple Bandō Sanjūsankasho pilgrimage route. Due to its location near the summit of the 1121 meter Mount Yamizo, the highest peak in Ibaraki Prefecture, it is regarded as most difficult part of the pilgrimage for pilgrims.

== Access ==
The temple is located approximately 24 kilometers northwest, or approximately 35-minutes by car, from Hitachi-Daigo Station on the JR East Suigun Line.
