= Mizusawa-dera =

Buddhist temple in Japan

- 水澤寺
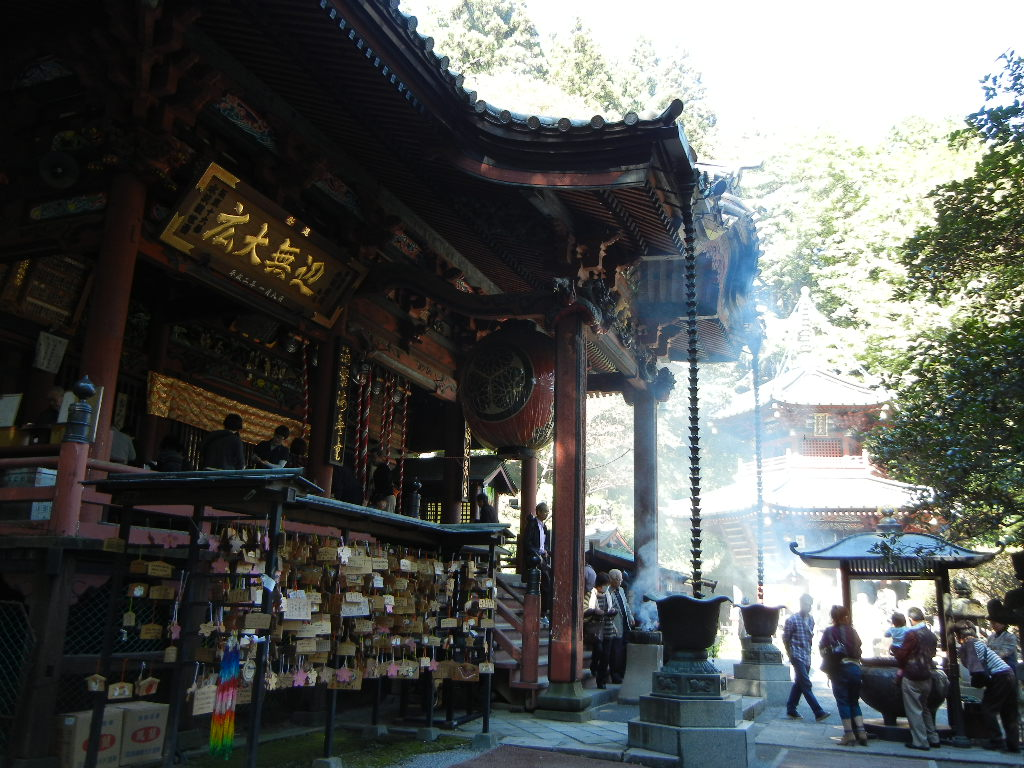
- Kannon-dō (Main hall)

- Location within Gunma Prefecture Location within Japan

Religion
- Affiliation: Buddhist
- Deity: Jūichimen Senjū Kannon
- Rite: Tendai
- Status: functioning

Location
- Location: 214 Mizusawa, Ikaho-machi, Shibukawa-shi, Gunma 377-0103
- Country: Japan
- Interactive map of Mizusawa-dera
- Coordinates: 36°28′45.6″N 138°56′43″E

Architecture
- Founder: c.Empress Suiko
- Completed: c.Asuka period

Website
- http://www.mizusawakannon.or.jp/index.php

Mizusawa-dera (水澤寺) is a Buddhist temple located in the city of Shibukawa in Gunma Prefecture, Japan. It belongs to the Tendai sect and its honzon is a statue of statue of Senjū Kannon Bosatsu (Sahasrabhūja).The temple's full name is Gotokuzan Muryōjū-in Jion-ji (五徳山 無量壽院 水澤寺).The temple is the 16th stop on the Bandō Sanjūsankasho pilgrimage route. The temple is also referred to as the Mizusawa-Kannon (水 澤 観 音).

== History ==
The foundation of the temple is uncertain and all ancient documentary evidence pre-dating the Edo period has been lost. According to temple's own legend, it was founded in the Asuka period. During the reign of Emperor Richū the Kokushi of Kōzuke province Takanobe Ienari had three daughters. Their evil stepmother attempted to kill all three, but when she attempted to have the youngest, Princess Ihaho, drowned in an abyss, she was saved by the intervention of Kannon Bosatsu. She subsequently married the new kokushi, Lieutenant General Takamitsu. Later, Empress Suiko invited Ekan, a high-ranking prelate from Goguryeo to introduce Buddhism to the region, and the by-then widowed Princess Ikaho donated her personal statue of Kannon Bosatsu to be the honzon statue of the temple.. The temple has been destroyed by fires several times in its history.

The temple is located approximately 8.4 kilometers west of Shibukawa Station of the JR East Jōetsu Line

== Cultural Properties ==
=== Gunma Prefectural Tangible Cultural Properties ===
- Rokkaku-dō (六角二重塔). This two-story hexagonal hall is a kyōzō with a rotating sutra library on its ground floor and a state of Dainichi Nyōrai on its second story. It was built between 1775 and 1787
- Kannon-dō (観音堂). The main hall of the temple, it was built during the Genroku era and completed a 33-year major renovation in the 7th year of Tenmei.
- Niōmon (仁王門). The main gate of the temple, it was built during the Genroku era and completed a 33-year major renovation in the 7th year of Tenmei.

=== Shibusawa City Tangible Cultural Properties ===
- Wooden Amida Nyorai seated statue (阿弥陀如来坐像), Edo period, attributed to Enkū
- Wooden Juichimen Kannon Bosatsu standing statue (木造十一面観音立像), Heian period, 11th century, attributed to Jōchō school

== Gallery ==
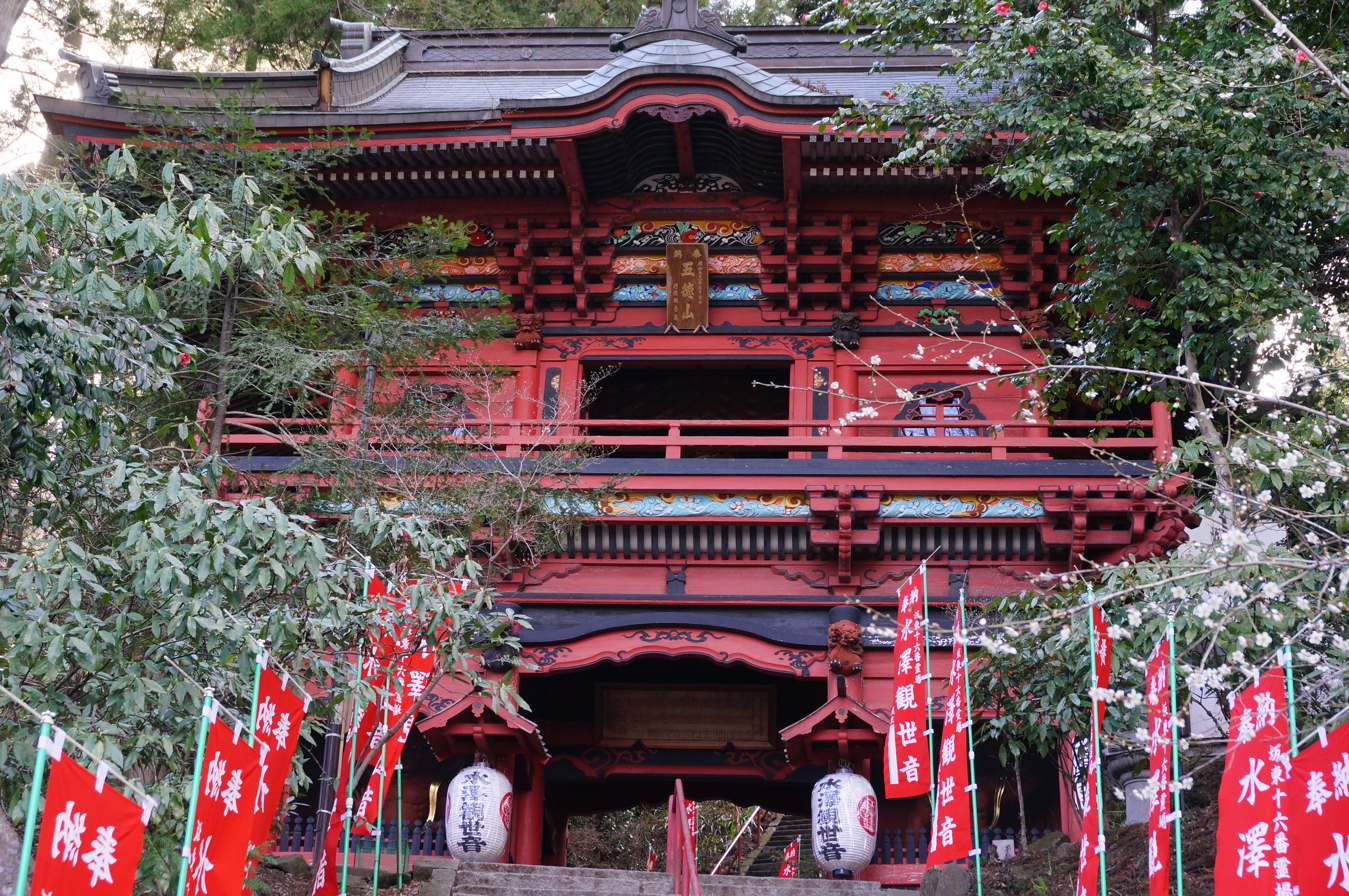
Niō-mon

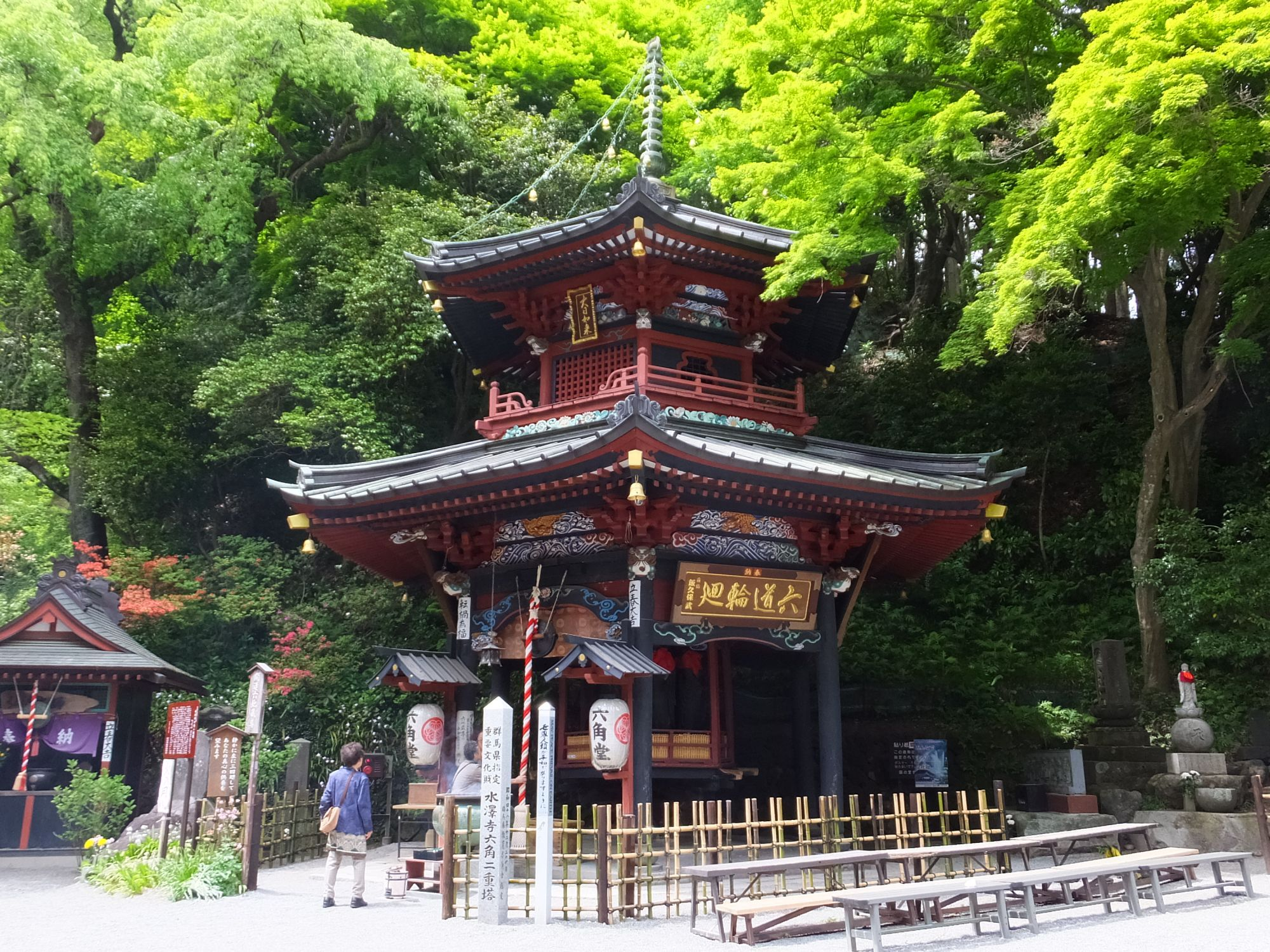
Rokkaku-dō

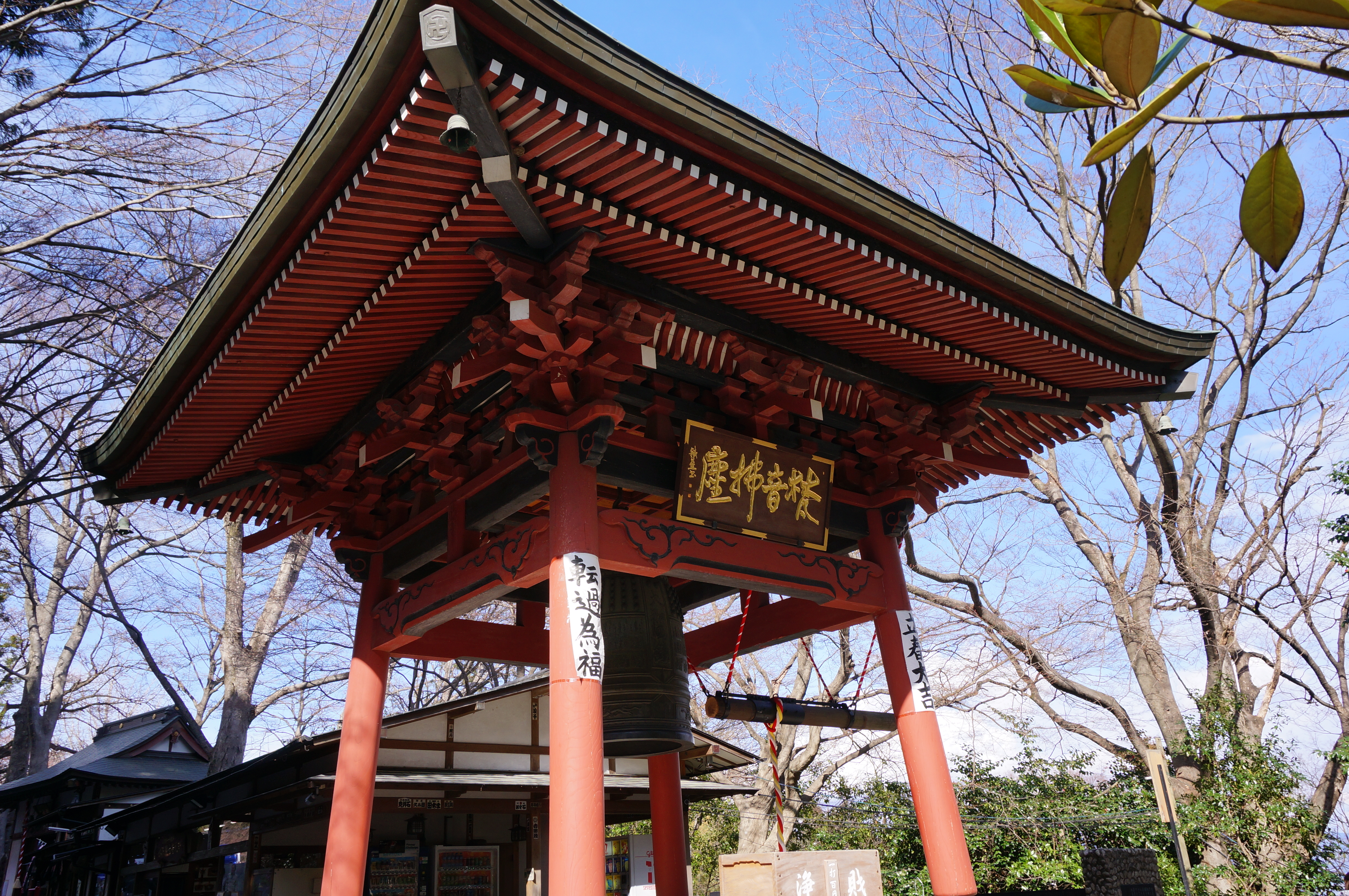
Bonshō

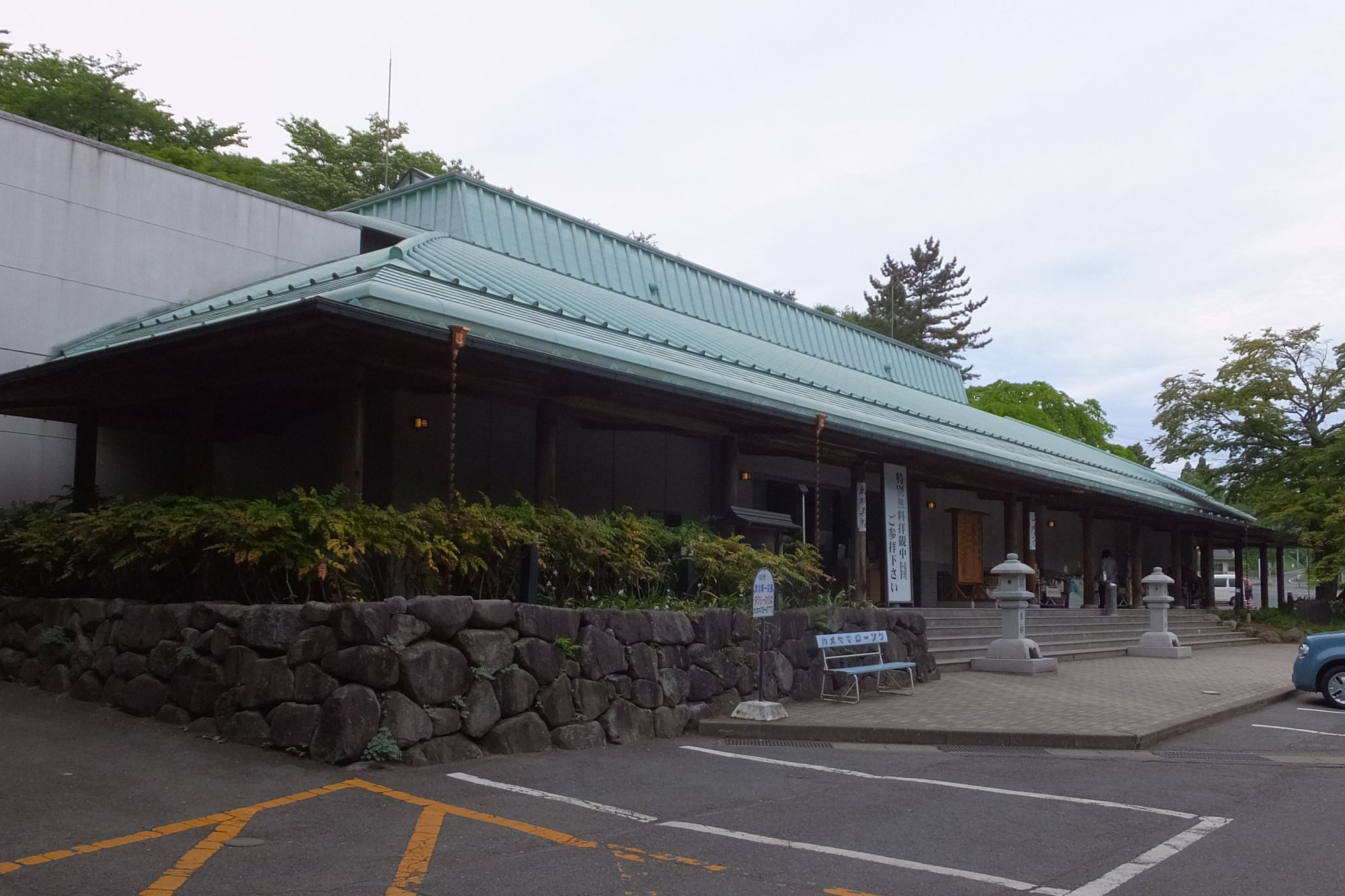
Shaka-dō
