= Ryūshō-in =

Buddhist temple in Narita, Chiba, Japan

- 龍正院
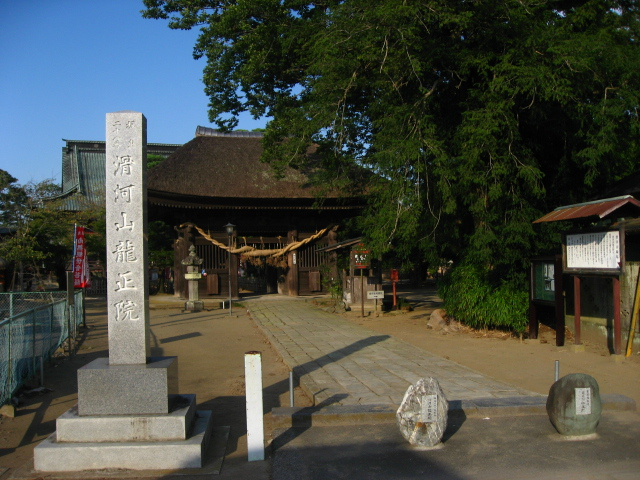
- Kannon-dō (Hondō)

- Location within Chiba Prefecture Location within Japan

Religion
- Affiliation: Buddhist
- Deity: Jūichimen Kannon Bosatsu
- Rite: Tendai
- Status: functional

Location
- Location: 1196 Namegawa, Narita-shi, Chiba-ken
- Country: Japan
- Coordinates: 35°52′01.5″N 140°20′31.0″E

Architecture
- Founder: c.Ennin
- Completed: c.838

Website
- Official website
- Important Cultural Property

Ryūshō-in (龍正院) is a Buddhist temple located in the Namegawa neighborhood of the city of Narita, Chiba Prefecture, Japan. It is a temple of the Tendai school and its honzon is a statue of Jūichimen Kannon Bosatsu, called the Namegawa Kannon (滑河観音). The temples full name is Namegawa-zan Ryūshō-in Shōfuku-ji (滑河山龍正院 勝福寺). The temple is the 28th stop on the Bandō Sanjūsankasho pilgrimage route.

== History ==
The origins of this temple are uncertain. According to the temple's legend, in the year 838 there was a great drought. The ruler of Namegawa Castle, Oda Masaharu, supported the people by donating grain and money and praying the Lotus Sutra. His daughter, Princess Asahi promised to bring help from Kannon Bosatsu and disappeared into the Tone River. An old monk then appeared in a boat and brought a small Kannon figure, which he gave to the lord. Living conditions in the area improved and he requested that Ennin construct a temple. The small Kannon figure is a hibutsu hidden image within the current honzon statue, which the temple attributes to the famed sculptor Jōchō.

The temple's Niōmon gate dates Bunki era (1501-1504) and is designated a National Important Cultural Property.

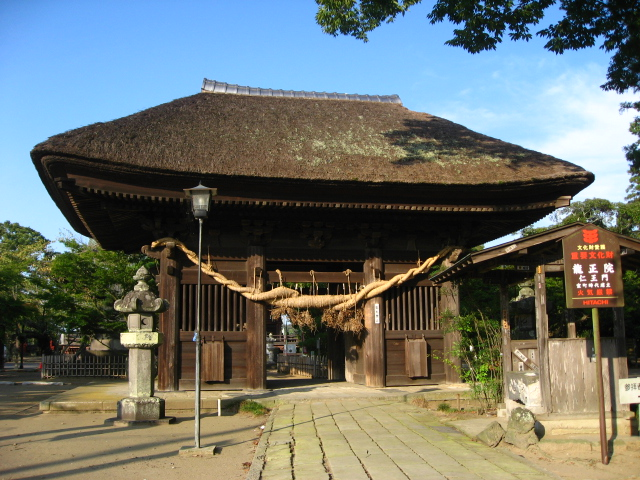
Niōmon (ICP)

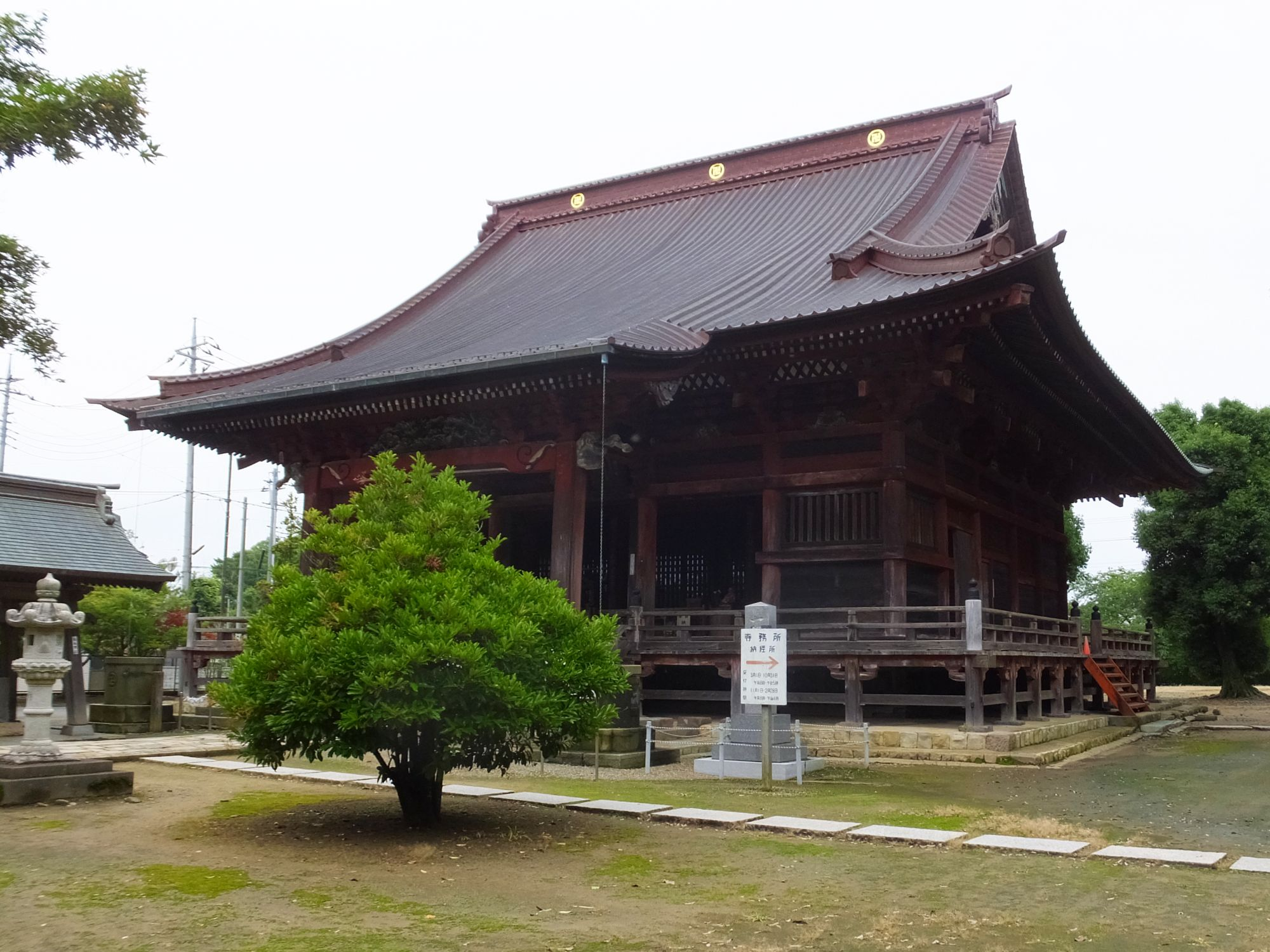
Kannon-dō

== Bandō Sanjūsankasho (Bandō 33 temple pilgrimage) ==
The temple is the 28th temple on the 33 temple Bandō Sanjūsankasho pilgrimage route.

== Access ==
The temple is a 20-minute walk from Namegawa Station on the JR East Narita Line.

== Cultural Properties ==
=== National Important Cultural Properties ===
- Niō-mon (仁王門), Muromachi period, built in the Bunki era (1501-1504). Designated a National Important Cultural Property in 1916.

=== Chiba Prefectural Tangible Cultural Properties ===
- Hondō (本堂) Edo Period, built in 1698. It is a five-by-five bay square hall, and has a hipped roof.
- Bronze Waniguchi gong (鋳銅鰐口) Muromachi Period. It has a diameter of 54.0 cm, with an eight-leaf, multi-petaled lotus pattern in the center divided into three layers by obi lines on both sides. It is inscribed with the date of 1516 and that it was made by a local foundry worker and dedicated to Shōfuku-ji (Ryūshō-in).
- Bronze Hōkyōintō (銅造宝篋印塔) Edo Period. The hōkyōintō pagoda is on the left hand side when facing the main hall in the Ryūshō-in precincts. It is placed on a four-tier ashlar platform, 4.97 meters high, the width of one side of the lowest pedestal is 3.37 meters, the side of the copper pedestal is 1.468 meters, the height of the pedestal is 1.46 meters from the ground, and it is made of cast bronze. The accompanying bronze tag indicates that it was cast on April 5, 1718, by Takumi Obata, a resident of Kanda, Edo. In addition, the names of many people who donated construction funds are engraved in the space between the bronze pedestals.
