= Shōkoku-ji (Zama) =

Buddhist temple in Zama, Kanagawa Prefecture, Japan

- 星谷寺
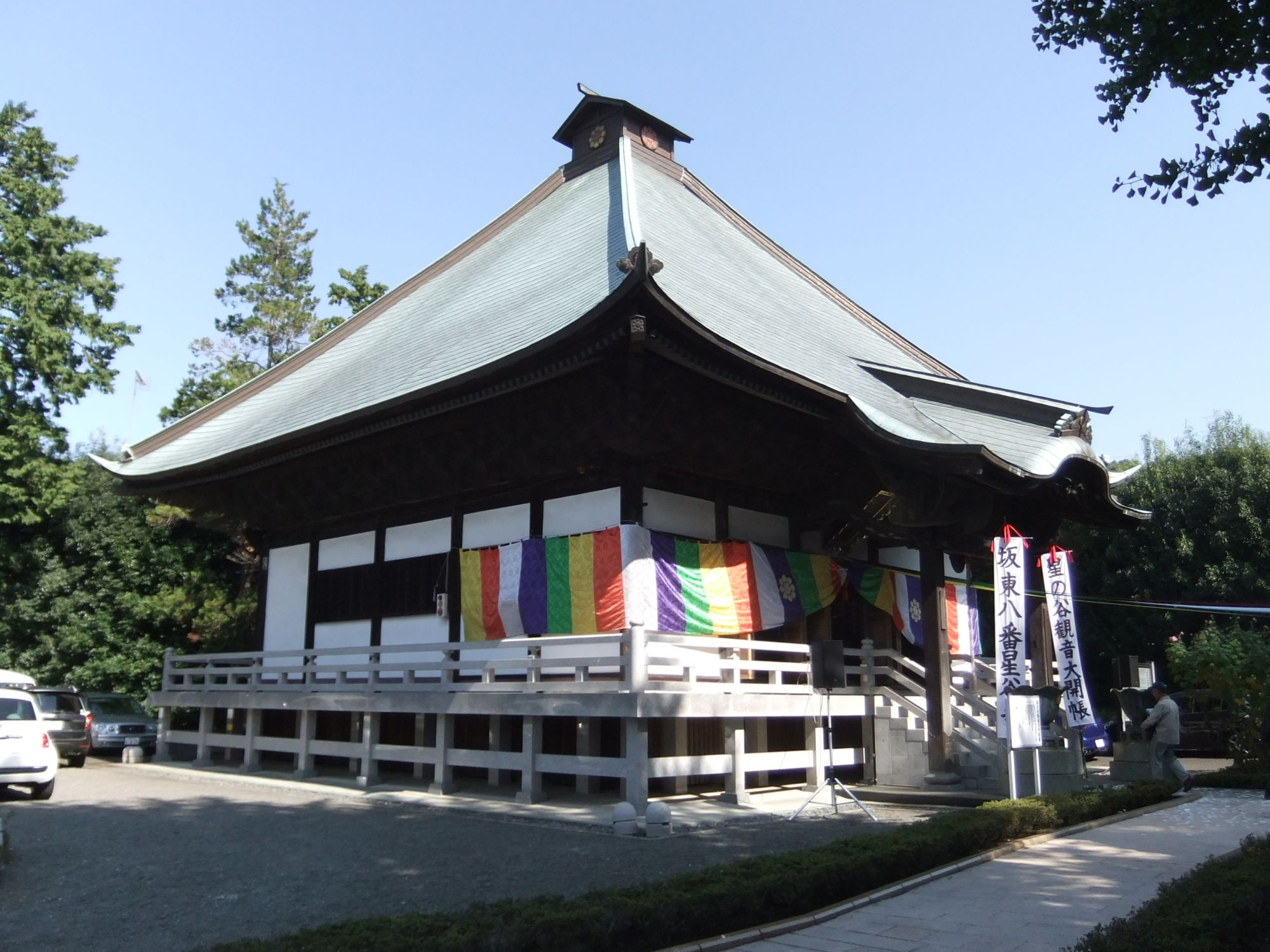
- Shōkoku-ji Kannon-dō

- Location within Kanagawa Prefecture Location within Japan

Religion
- Affiliation: Buddhist
- Deity: Shō-Kannon Bosatsu
- Rite: Shingon-shū Daikakuji-ha
- Status: functional

Location
- Location: 3-3583-1 Iriya, Zama-shi, Kanagawa-ken
- Country: Japan
- Interactive map of Shōkoku-ji
- Coordinates: 35°29′5.6″N 139°23′56″E

Architecture
- Founder: unknown
- Completed: unknown
- National Important Cultural Property }

Shōkoku-ji (星谷寺) is a Buddhist temple located in the Iriya-nishi neighborhood of the city of Zama, Kanagawa Prefecture, Japan. It belongs to the Shingon-shū Daikaku-ha sect and its honzon is a statue of Shō-Kannon Bosatsu. The temple's full name is Myōhō-san Jihō-in Shōkoku-ji (妙法山 持寶院 星谷寺).The temple is the 8th stop on the Bandō Sanjūsankasho pilgrimage route. It is also called the "Hoshiya Kannon".

== History ==
Details of the founding of this temple are uncertain. According to the temple's legend, it was founded as a hermitage on a mountaintop 400 meters to the northeast of the temple by the monk Gyōki in the Tenpyō era (729-749). When that hermitage burned down during the Kamakura period, it was rebuilt on the current site.

The temple was supported in the Sengoku period by the Hōjō clan. During the Edo period, the temple received a tax exemption from the Tokugawa shogunate for its upkeep .

== Bandō Sanjūsankasho (Bandō 33 temple pilgrimage) ==
The temple is the 8th temple on the 33 temple Bandō Sanjūsankasho pilgrimage route.

== Access ==
The temple is located approximately a five-minute walk from Zama Station (Odakyu Odawara Line).

== Cultural Properties ==
=== National Important Cultural Properties ===
- Bonshō (銅鐘); Shōho-ji's bronze bell is dated 1227, making it the oldest in Kanagawa Prefecture, and the 50th oldest existing temple bell in Japan and the second oldest in the Kantō region.
