= Bandō Sanjūsankasho =

Buddhist pilgrimage in Japan

The Bandō Sanjūsankasho (坂東三十三ヵ所) is a pilgrimage of thirty-three Buddhist temples throughout the Kantō region of Japan, similar to the Saigoku Kannon Pilgrimage and the Shikoku Pilgrimage. From its beginning at Kamakura's Sugimoto-dera to its end in Chiba's Nago-ji, the circuit is over 1300 km long. The principal image of each temple in the route is Kannon Bosatsu, the Bodhisattva associated with compassion. Kannon Bosatsu is the common Japanese name for Avalokiteśvara. She was first given the appellation "Goddess of Mercy" or "Mercy Goddess" by Jesuit missionaries in China. There is considerable variation among the styles of images of Kannon Bosatsu, and the attributes each style possesses. The Bandō Sanjūsankasho is just one of over 70 different Kannon pilgrimage circuits existing in Japan, each including 33 temples because the goddess is believed to have 33 different manifestations.

It is traditional for pilgrims to wear white clothing and conical straw hats and to carry walking sticks. While the route was historically traveled by foot, today pilgrims usually use cars or trains. Pilgrims record their progress with a prayer book (納経帖, Nōkyō-chō), which the temple staff mark with red stamps and Japanese calligraphy indicating the temple number, the temple name, and the specific name of the Kannon image. Some pilgrims receive the stamps and calligraphy on wall scrolls (for a decorative hanging) and on their white coats (to be cremated in) as well. Even though women were allowed to pray at individual temples, the circuit was originally reserved to male pilgrims. Now however most of the pilgrims are women. Pilgrims traditionally left behind a slip of paper or a sticker as a proof of their visit, and many of these can be seen plastered on temple walls and pillars.

== History ==
The origins of the Bandō Sanjūsankasho pilgrimage, as with the temples on the route, is uncertain. The foundation legends of at least ten temples on the route state that cloistered Emperor Kazan visited and designated them as temples on the circuit; however, it is highly improbable that Emperor Kazan visited the Kantō region in person. Emperor Kazan is known for having revived the Saigoku Kannon Pilgrimage after which the Bandō circuit is patterned. Any association between Emperor Kazan and any temple in the Bandō circuit only appears from the late Muromachi period, but this tradition was believed at least until the end of Edo period. For example, the "Bandō Kannon Sacred Place Record" written by Ryomori Samon states that when the Cloistered Emperor Kazan was praying at dawn at Hase-dera in Yamato Province, an old monk in a fragrant robe appeared and proclaimed that he was spirit of the Eight Provinces where Kannon Bosatsu appears in thirty-three places and told him to establish the circuit.

Although there are no historical documents that clarify its history, it is known from the Azuma Kagami and other sources that Minamoto no Yoritomo was an extremely ardent believer in Kannon. Furthermore, Minamoto no Sanetomo was also known for his piety and his infatuation with all things from the Imperial Court in Kyoto. The fact that the first four temples in the circuit indicates a deep connection with the Kamakura shogunate. In 1192, when Yoritomo held the 49th memorial service for Cloistered Emperor Go-Shirakawa in Kamakura, 100 monks from various temples in the Kantō region attended, many of whom were coming from temples listed on the Bandō Sanjūsankasho circuit. During the Kamakura period, pilgrimages to the Kumano shrines became very popular; however, few local samurai or minor warlords could afford to make the distant journey. Another impetus was that Tendai and Shingon temples were actively popularizing the concept of the pilgrimage, partly to offset the populist preachings of the new Pure Land and Nichiren movements.

The first mention of the Bandō Sanjūsankasho in historical documentation is in 1234, only 15 years after Minamoto no Sanetomo's death, in an inscription found within a Kannon statue. This inscription states that a monk, probably a Shugendō, called Seiben, was on a pilgrimage to 33 places and carved a statue of Kannon. Many of the temples in the circuit have a connection with Shugendō, and in the Kamakura period, it appears that the pilgrimages on the Bandō circuit were made by monk or senior samurai and there was little participation by the general public. This gradually changed in the Muromachi period, and a number of wooden pilgrimage tags left at various temples dated from the Bunmei era (1468-1482) have been found, some of which gave an address from places in Ōshu and other distant locations. At the end of the Muromachi period, pilgrimages to the "100 Kannon Temples"' began with the Bandō circuit added to the Saigoku circuit and the 34 temples of the Chichibu pilgrimage. This became even more popular during the Edo period, where guidebooks began to appear.

The most noteworthy of the Edo period guides is the Sanjusansho Bandō Kannon Reibaki (三十三所坂東観音霊場記) in ten volumes written by the famous Shingon sect priest Ryōmori and was published in 1771. Ryōmori, who was chief priest at Nichirin-ji, claimed to have visited each temple several times, transcribing temple records, asking local elders about legends, and also collected records from local and foreign sources. He advised that it would take at least 40 days to complete the pilgrimage. It appears that the ordering of the 33 temples in the Bandō circuit has not changed since its inception, following the temples in numerical sequence has never been regarded as necessary and many Edo period guidebook noted that the total distance of the circuit was very long compared to the other pilgrimages and that the route was complicated to follow in order.

No.	Temple	Honzon (main image)	Sangō	Popularly	Sect	Location	Coordinates	Image
1	Sugimoto-dera (杉本寺)	Jūichimen Kannon (Ekādaśamukha)	Daizōzan (大蔵山)	Sugimoto Kannon	Tendai	Kamakura, Kanagawa	35.322611°N 139.567444°E	Sugimoto-dera
2	Ganden-ji (岩殿寺)	Jūichimen Kannon (Ekādaśamukha)	Kaiunzan (海雲山)	Iwadono Kannon	Sōtō	Zushi, Kanagawa	35.305056°N 139.572306°E	Ganden-ji
3	An'yō-in (安養院)	Senju Kannon (Sahasra-bhuja)	Gionzan (祇園山)	Tashiro Kannon	Jōdō	Kamakura, Kanagawa	35.314167°N 139.555278°E	An'yō-in
4	Hase-dera (長谷寺)	Jūichimen Kannon (Ekādaśamukha)	Kaikōzan (海光山)	Hase Kannon	Jōdō	Kamakura, Kanagawa	35.3125°N 139.533056°E	Hase-dera
5	Shōfuku-ji (勝福寺)	Jūichimen Kannon (Ekādaśamukha)	Iizumizan (飯泉山)	Iizumi Kannon	Shingon-shū Tōji-ha	Odawara, Kanagawa	35.280028°N 139.164333°E	Shōfuku-ji
6	Chōkoku-ji (長谷寺)	Jūichimen Kannon (Ekādaśamukha)	Iizumizan (飯泉山)	Iiyama Kannon	Kōyasan Shingon-shū	Atsugi, Kanagawa	35.471611°N 139.303833°E	Hase-dera
7	Kōmyō-ji (光明寺)	Shō Kannon (Aryavalokitesvara)	Kanamesan (金目山)	Kaname Kannon	Tendai	Hiratsuka, Kanagawa	35.35875°N 139.288778°E	Kōmyō-ji
8	Shōkoku-ji (星谷寺)	Shō Kannon (Aryavalokitesvara)	Myōhōzan (妙法山)	Hoshi-no-ya Kannon	Shingon-shū Daikakuji-ha	Zama, Kanagawa	35.484889°N 139.398889°E	Shōkoku-ji
9	Jikō-ji (慈光寺)	Jūichimen Senjū Kannon (Ekādaśamukha)	Tokisan (都幾山)	---	Tendai	Tokigawa, Saitama	36.010944°N 139.229889°E	Jikō-ji
10	Shōbō-ji (正法寺)	Senjū Kannon ( Sahasrabhūja)	Iwadonosan (巌殿山)	Iwadono Kannon	Shingon-shū Chisan-ha	Higashimatsuyama, Saitama	36.001389°N 139.362361°E	Shōbō-ji
11	Anraku-ji (安楽寺)	Shō Kannon (Aryavalokitesvara)	Iwadonosan (巌殿山)	Iwadono Kannon	Shingon-shū Chisan-ha	Yoshimi, Saitama	36.054333°N 139.438278°E	Anraku-ji
12	Jion-ji (慈恩寺)	Senjū Kannon (Sahasrabhuja)	Karinsan (華林山)	Jion-ji Kannon	Tendai	Saitama, Saitama	35.979444°N 139.710778°E	Jion-ji
13	Sensō-ji (浅草寺)	Shō Kannon (Aryavalokitesvara)	Kinryuzan (金龍山)	Asakusa Kannon	Shokannon-shu	Asakusa, Tokyo	35.714722°N 139.79675°E	Sensō-ji
14	Gumyō-ji (弘明寺)	Jūichimen Kannon (Ekādaśamukha)	Zuiōsan (瑞応山)	Gumyō-ji Kannon	Kōyasan Shingon-shū	Yokohama, Kanagawa	35.424167°N 139.597417°E	Gumyō-ji
15	Chōkoku-ji (長谷寺)	Jūichimen Kannon (Ekādaśamukha)	Shiraiwasan (白岩山)	Shiraiwa Kannon	Kinpusen Shugen Hon-kyō	Takasaki, Gunma	36.385278°N 138.932639°E	Chōkoku-ji
16	Mizusawa-dera (水澤寺)	Senjū Kannon (Sahasrabhuja)	Gotokusan (五徳山)	Mizusawa Kannon	Tendai	Shibukawa, Gunma	36.479333°N 138.945278°E	Mizusawa-dera
17	Mangan-ji (満願寺)	Senjū Kannon (Sahasrabhuja)	Izurusan (出流山)	Izuru Kannon	Shingon-shū Chisan-ha	Tochigi, Tochigi	36.475528°N 139.58925°E	Mangan-ji
18	Chūzen-ji ((日光山))	Senjū Kannon (Sahasrabhuja)	Nikkōsan (日光山)	Tachiki Kannon	Tendai	Nikkō, Tochigi	36.730917°N 139.491667°E	Chūzen-ji
19	Ōya-ji (大谷寺)	Senju Kannon (Sahasrabhuja)	Izurusan (出流山)	Mizusawa Kannon	Tendai	Utsunomiya, Tochigi	36.596222°N 139.820917°E	Ōya-ji
20	Saimyō-ji	Jūichimen Kannon (Ekādaśamukha)	Tokkosan (獨鈷山)	Mashiko Kannon	Shingon-shu Buzan-ha	Mashiko, Tochigi	36.452778°N 140.117361°E	Saimyō-ji
21	Nichirin-ji	Jūichimen Kannon (Ekādaśamukha)	Yamizusan (八溝山)	Yamizusan Kannon	Tendai	Daigo, Ibaraki	36.921194°N 140.273722°E	Nichirin-ji
22	Satake-ji	Jūichimen Kannon (Ekādaśamukha)	Myōfukusan (妙福山)	Kitamuki Kannon	Shingon-shu Buzan-ha	Hitachiōta, Ibaraki	36.526028°N 140.504667°E	Satake-ji
23	Shōfuku-ji (正福寺)	Senjū Kannon (Sahasrabhuja )	Sashirosan (佐白山)	Sashiro Kannon	Shingon	Kasama, Ibaraki	36.386306°N 140.259611°E	Shōfuku-ji
24	Rakuhō-ji (楽法寺)	Enmei Shō-Kannon	Amabikisan (雨引山)	Amabiki Kannon	Shingon-shu Buzan-ha	Sakuragawa, Ibaraki	36.330833°N 140.120833°E	Rakuhō-ji
25	Ōmi-dō (大御堂)	Senjū Kannon (Sahasrabhuja)	Tsukubasan (筑波山)	Ōmi-dō Kannon	Shingon-shu Buzan-ha	Tsukuba, Ibaraki	36.212639°N 140.099417°E	Ōmi-dō
26	Kiyotaki-ji (清滝寺)	Shō Kannon (Aryavalokitesvara)	Nanmeisan (南明山)	Kiyotaki Kannon	Shingon-shu Buzan-ha	Tsuchiura, Ibaraki	36.165194°N 140.167361°E	Kiyotaki-ji
27	Enpuku-ji (圓福寺)	Jūichimen Kannon (Ekādaśamukha)	Iinumasan (飯沼山)	Iinuma Kannon	Shingon	Chōshi, Chiba	35.731944°N 140.840611°E	Enpuku-ji
28	Ryūshō-in	Jūichimen Kannon (Ekādaśamukha)	Namegawasan (滑河山)	Namegawa Kannon	Tendai	Narita, Chiba	35.867083°N 140.341944°E	Ryūshō-in
29	Chiba-dera	Jūichimen Kannon (Ekādaśamukha)	Kaijōsan (海上山)	Senyō-ji Kannon	Shingon-shu Buzan-ha	Chiba	35.595139°N 140.131694°E	Chiba-dera
30	Kōzō-ji (高蔵寺)	Shō Kannon (Aryavalokitesvara)	Heiyasan (平野山)	Takakura Kannon	Shingon-shu Buzan-ha	Kisarazu, Chiba	35.338806°N 139.994444°E	Kōzō-ji
31	Kasamori-ji (笠森寺)	Jūichimen Kannon (Ekādaśamukha)	Daihizan (大悲山)	Kasamori Kannon	Tendai	Chōnan, Chiba	35.399611°N 140.198917°E	Kasamori-ji
32	Kiyomizu-dera (清水寺)	Senjū Kannon (Sahasrabhuja)	Otowasan (音羽山)	Kiyomizu Kannon	Tendai	Isumi, Chiba	35.290139°N 140.356333°E	Kiyomizu-dera
33	Nago-ji (那古寺)	Senjū Kannon (Sahasrabhuja)	Fudarakusan (補陀洛山)	Kiyomizu Kannon	Tendai	Tateyama, Chiba	35.025556°N 139.857972°E	Nago-dera

== See also ==
- Japan 100 Kannon, pilgrimage composed of the Saigoku, Bandō and Chichibu pilgrimages
  - Saigoku 33 Kannon, pilgrimage in the Kansai region.
  - Chichibu 34 Kannon, pilgrimage in Saitama Prefecture
- Shikoku Pilgrimage, 88 Temple pilgrimage in the Shikoku island
- Musashino Kannon Pilgrimage, pilgrimage in Tokyo and Saitama prefectures
- Chūgoku 33 Kannon, pilgrimage in the Chūgoku region
- Kannon
- Buddhism in Japan
