= Iiyama Kannon =

Buddhist temple in Kanagawa Prefecture, Japan

Chōkoku-ji
- 長谷寺
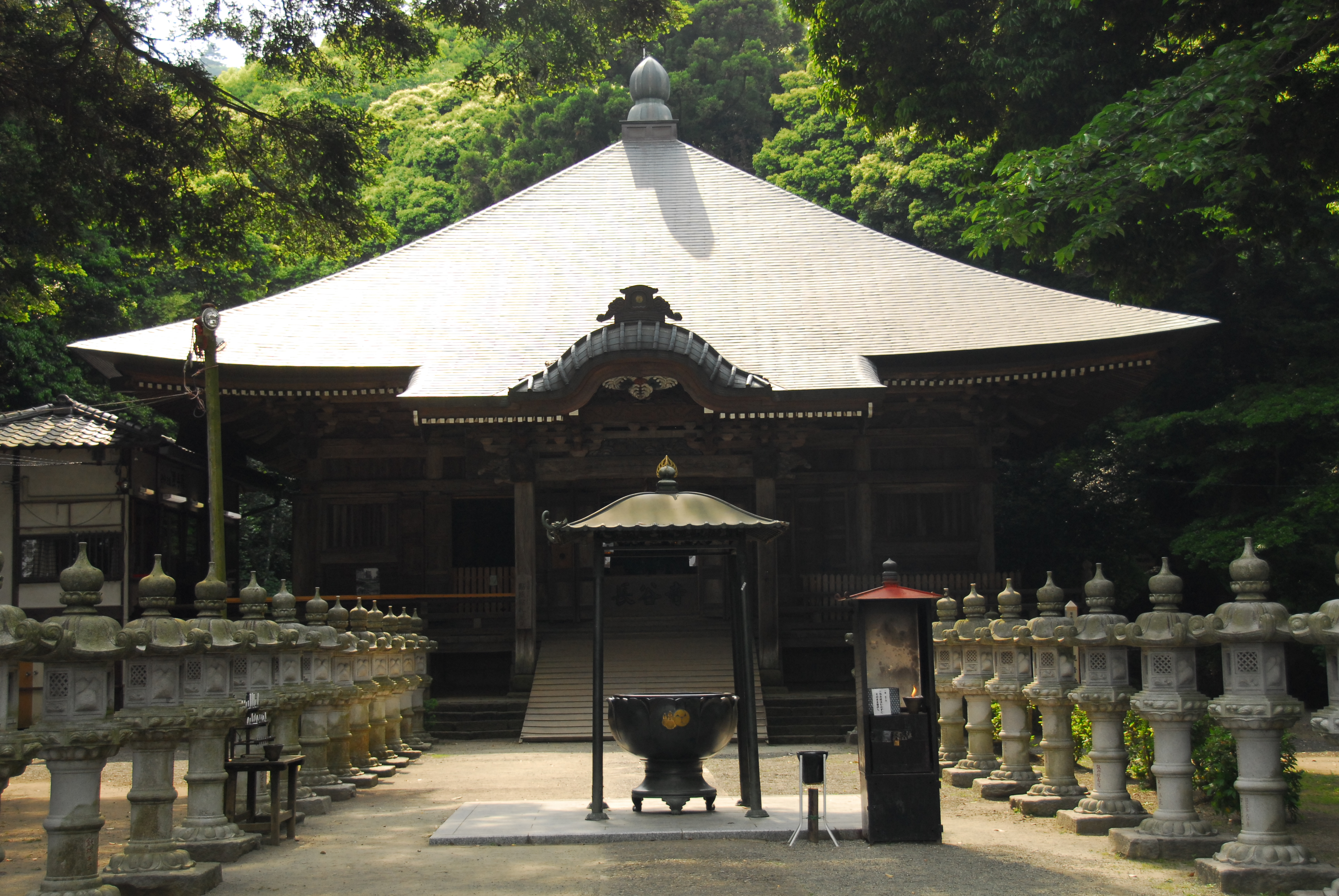
- Chōkoku-ji Hondō

- Location within Kanagawa Prefecture Location within Japan

Religion
- Affiliation: Buddhist
- Deity: Jūichimen Kannon Bosatsu
- Rite: Kōyasan Shingon-shū
- Status: functional

Location
- Location: 5605 Iiyama, Atsugi-shi, Kanagawa-ken
- Country: Japan
- Coordinates: 35°28′17.8″N 139°18′13.8″E

Architecture
- Founder: c.Gyōki
- Completed: c.725

Website
- Official website

Chōkoku-ji (長谷寺) is a Buddhist temple located in the Iiyama neighborhood of the city of Atsugi, Kanagawa Prefecture, Japan. It belongs to the Kōyasan Shingon-shū sect and its honzon is a statue of Jūichimen Kannon Bosatsu. The temple's full name is Iiyama-san Nyoiri-in Chōkoku-ji (飯上山 如意輪院 長谷寺).The temple is the 6th stop on the Bandō Sanjūsankasho pilgrimage route. It is more popularly known as the Iiyama Kannon (飯山観音), after its primary object of worship.

== Overview ==
The foundation of this temple is uncertain. According to the temple's legend, it was founded either the wandering holy ascetic Gyōki around 725 AD, or the famed prelate Kūkai from 810–835 AD. However, no historical documents have survived to substantiate either legend. During the Kamakura period, the temple was a center for ecumenical studies linking the Shingon sect with the Tendai, Ritsu and Zen sects, along with Kakuon-ji in Kamakura and Shōmyo-ji in Mutsuura.

The temple is also noted for its sakura in spring.

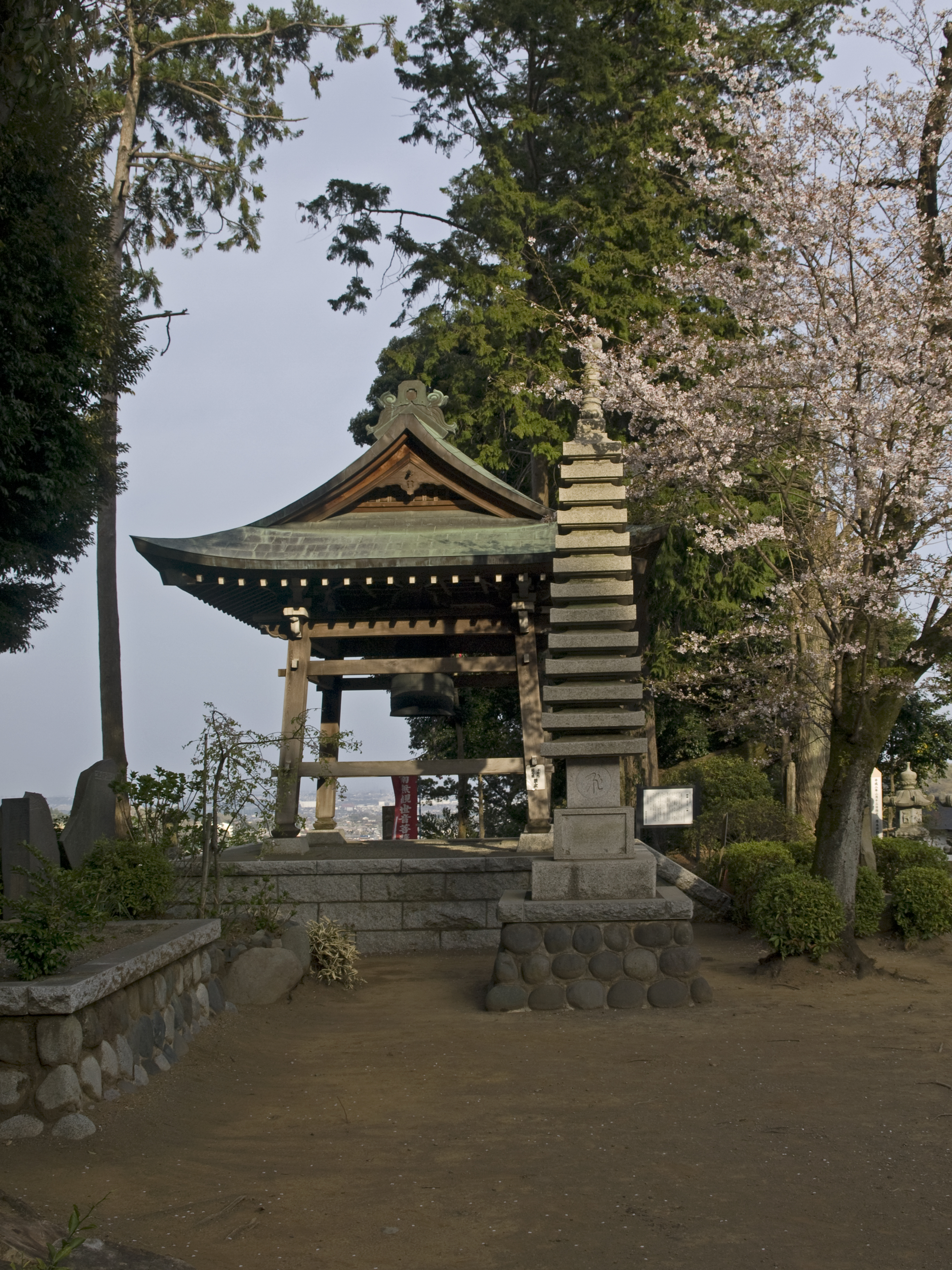
Shōrō

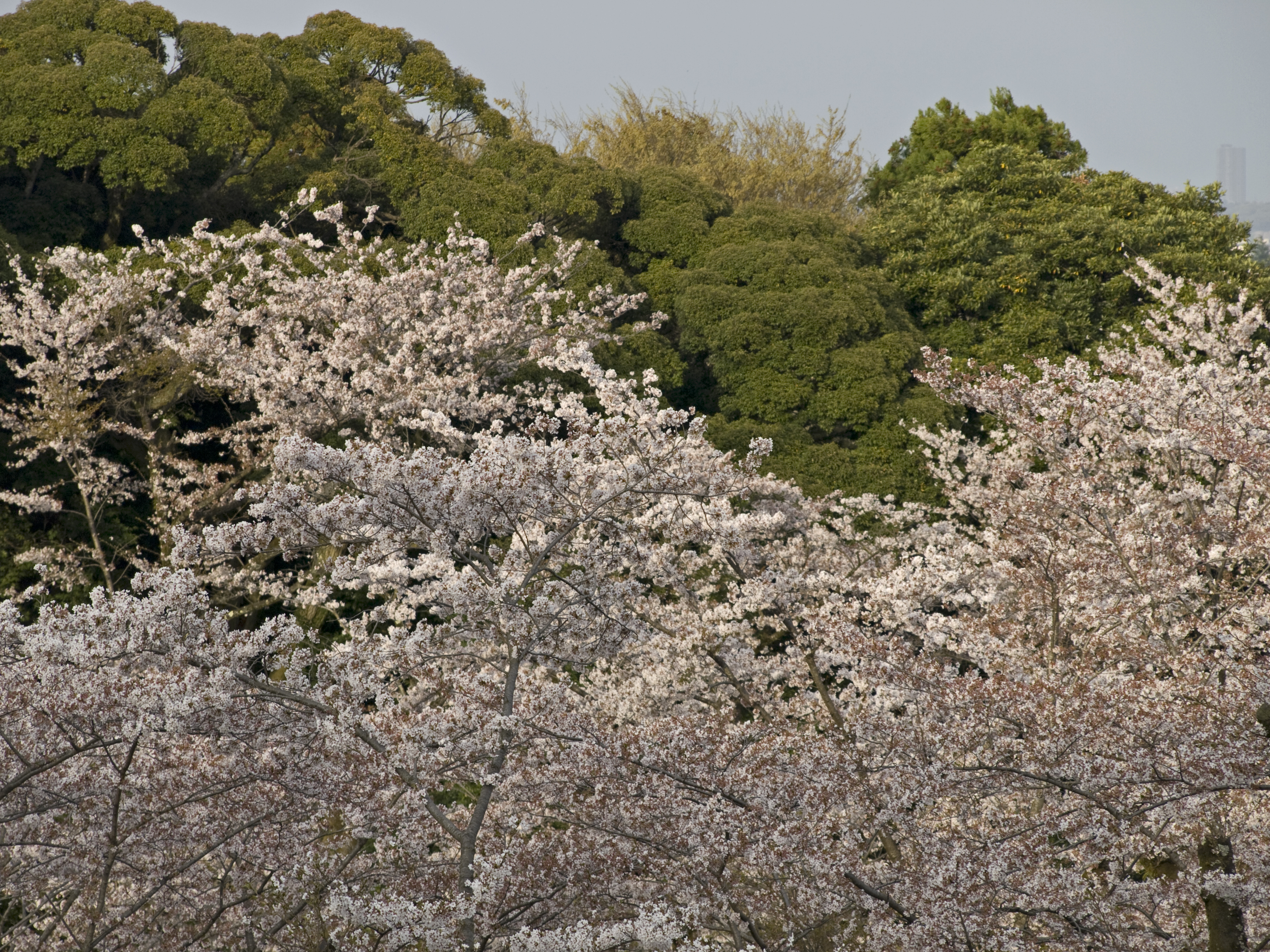
Iiyama Kannon Sakura

The temple is located approximately a five-minute walk from Zama Station (Odakyu Odawara Line).

== Cultural Properties ==
=== Kanagawa Prefectural Tangible Cultural Properties ===
- Bonshō (銅鐘); The inscription reveals that it was cast by the foundry worker Kiyohara Kunimitsu in 1442.

=== Atsugi City Tangible Cultural Properties ===
- Kannon-dō (観音堂); Kannon-dō Hall has a square plan with five girders and five beams, and the roof is roofed with copper sheets (formerly thatched). Judging from the architectural details, it is estimated to have been built in the mid-Edo period (mid-18th century).
