= Bodai-ji =

Buddhist temple in Sanda, Hyōgo, Japan

- 菩提寺
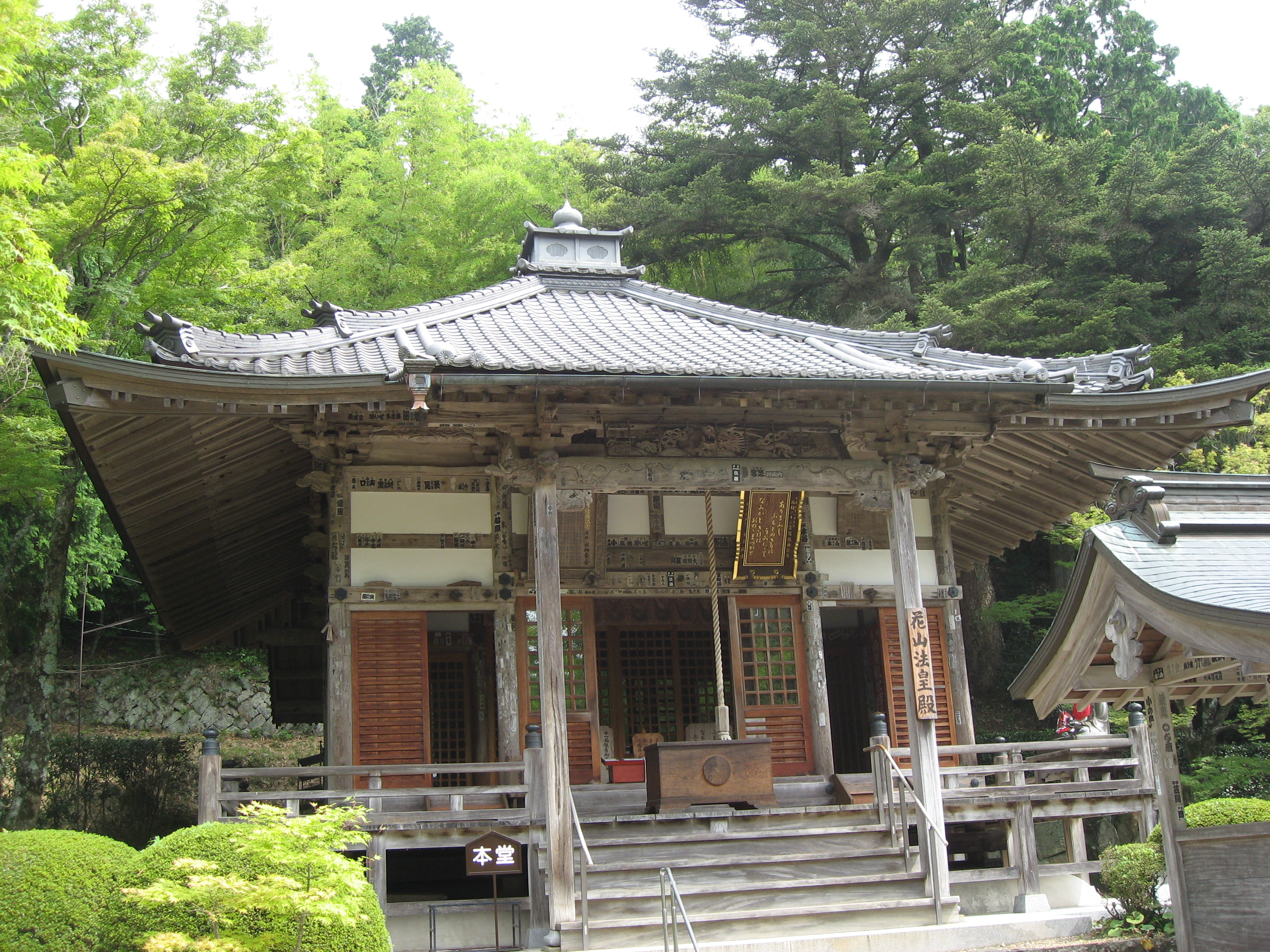
- Bodai-ji Hondo

- Location within Hyōgo Prefecture Location within Japan

Religion
- Affiliation: Buddhist
- Deity: Yakushi Nyorai
- Rite: Shingon
- Status: functional

Location
- Location: 352 Niiji, Sanda-shi, Hyōgo-ken 669-1505
- Interactive map of Bodai-ji
- Coordinates: 34°56′25.4″N 135°14′25.8″E

Architecture
- Founder: Hōdō
- Completed: c.651

Website
- Official website

Bodai-ji (菩提寺) is a Buddhist temple located in the Niiji neighborhood of Sanda City, Hyōgo Prefecture Japan. It is the head temple of the "Kazan-in" branch of the Shingon sect of Japanese Buddhism and its honzon (primary image) is a statue of Yakushi Nyorai. The temple has been more commonly known throughout its history as "Kazan-in" (花山院). The temple's full name is Tōkōzan Kazan-in Gankei-ji (東光山 花山院 菩提寺). The temple is a "bangai" (supernumerary) temple located between the 24th and 25th stops on the Saigoku Kannon Pilgrimage route. The temple is located at an elevation of approximately 395 meters on the south side of Mount Tōkōzan (approximately 421.3 meters above sea level), about six kilometers north of central Sanda City.

== History ==
Details surrounding the founding of this temple are uncertain. According to the temple's own legend, it was founded by Hōdō, an Indian mystic and sage. According to accounts such as the Kamakura period "Genkō Shakusho," the monk Hōdō flew to Japan on a purple cloud from India via Tang China and the Korean kingdom of Baekje. Once in Japan, he discovered a sacred mountain in the shape of an eight-petaled lotus flower in Kamo County, Harima Province (present-day Kasai, Hyōgo). Upon landing there, he named it "Mount Hokke," referring to the sacred mountain of the Lotus Sutra. Hōdō was known as the "Empty Bowl Sennin" (Empty Bowl Sage) because he is said to have used his supernatural powers to send bowls flying out to receive offerings such as rice. Temples with legends claiming to have been founded by the hermit Hōdō are concentrated in eastern Hyōgo Prefecture, and the possibility exists that there was a real person from India who inspired this legend and became a central figure in the local faith. However, there is no historical documentary evidence to support this theory.

Around 992, the cloistered Emperor Kazan was visiting the temples of the Saigoku Pilgrimage, the route of which he had restored. When he climbed to Banshū Kiyomizu-dera, he saw a shining light on the mountaintop to the east and decided to investigate. Arriving at the location he had even the light, he found this temple. The emperor then used the temple as a retreat, spending approximately 14 years there until his return to Heian-kyō (Kyoto) in his later years. This is why the temple, originally named Shiunzan Kannon-ji, was renamed Tōkōzan. Later, the temple buildings were completed with donations from Minamoto no Yorimitsu.

The village at the foot of the mountain, including this temple, is called Ninji (nunnery), a name derived from the legend that 11 ladies-in-waiting to the retired emperor visited the mountain bearing the memorial tablet of Fujiwara no Yoshiko, (the Emperor's favorite). They were not permitted to climb the mountain due to the ban on women entering the holy precincts, so they became nuns and settled at the foot of the mountain. Within the village, there are 12 large and small tombs said to be the graves of the 12 nuns (the large central monument is believed to be the kuyōtō (a form of stupa built for the purpose of memorial service so that the deceased can rest in peace) of Fujiwara no Yoshiko). There is also a stone monument on Kotohikizaka Hill, where the koto was played in admiration of the retired emperor.

In the 11th century, the Tada Genji clan, based in Tada-shō, became followers of the temple, and erected temple buildings and pagodas. However, these were later destroyed by lightning. Foundation stones of the destroyed buildings have been excavated from the mountain.

== Images of the temple ==
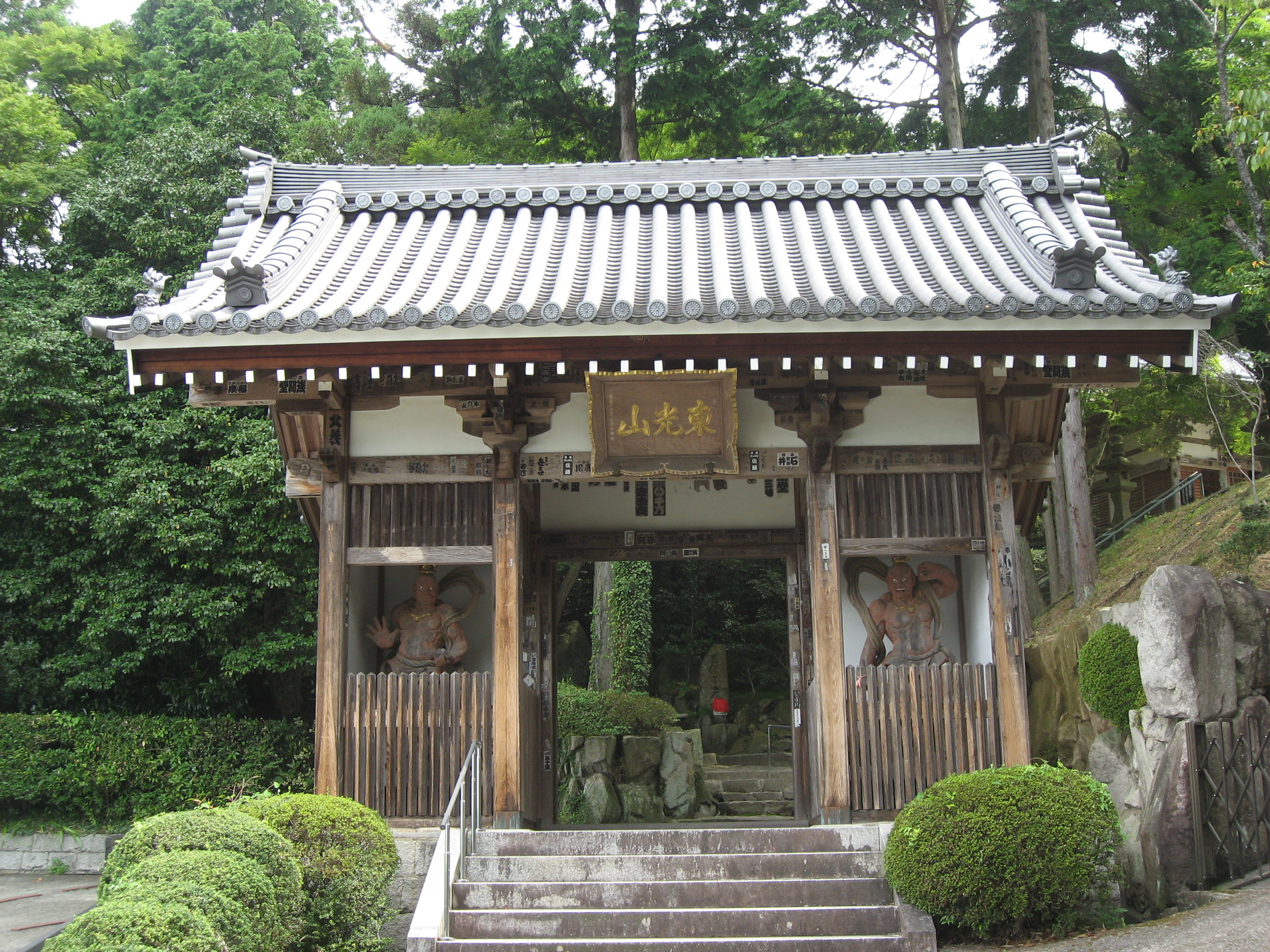
Sanmon

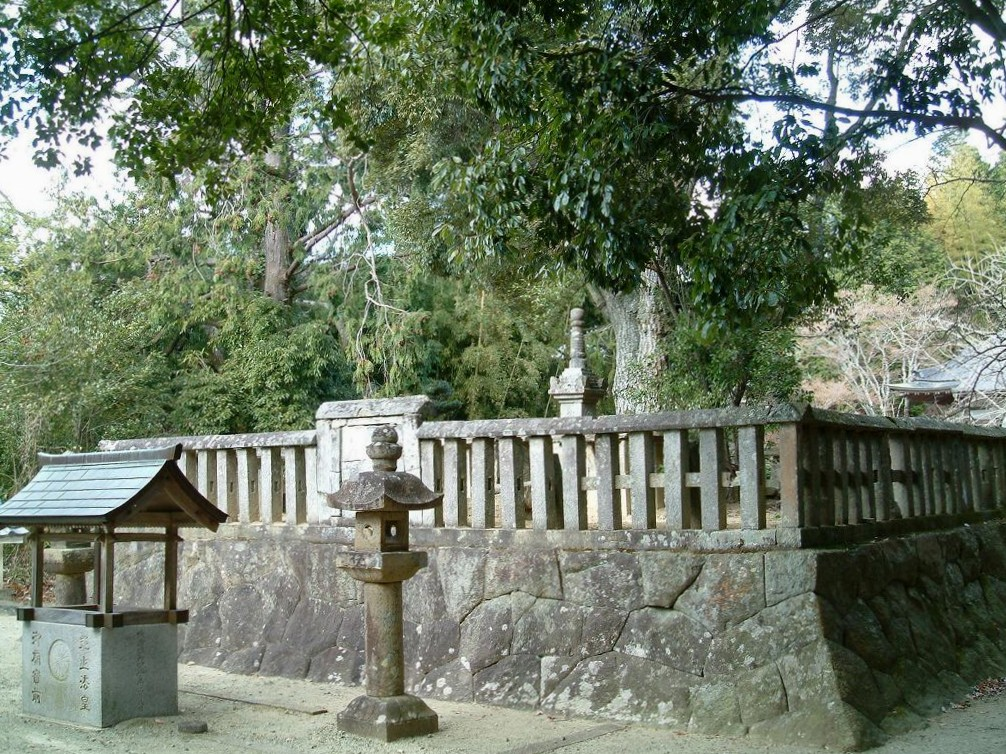
Emperor Kazan's Mausoleum

== Access ==
The temple is approximately seven kilometers northeast of Shin-Sanda Station on the JR West Fukuchiyama Line.
