= Hōki-in =

Buddhist temple in Sakurai, Nara, Japan

- 法起院
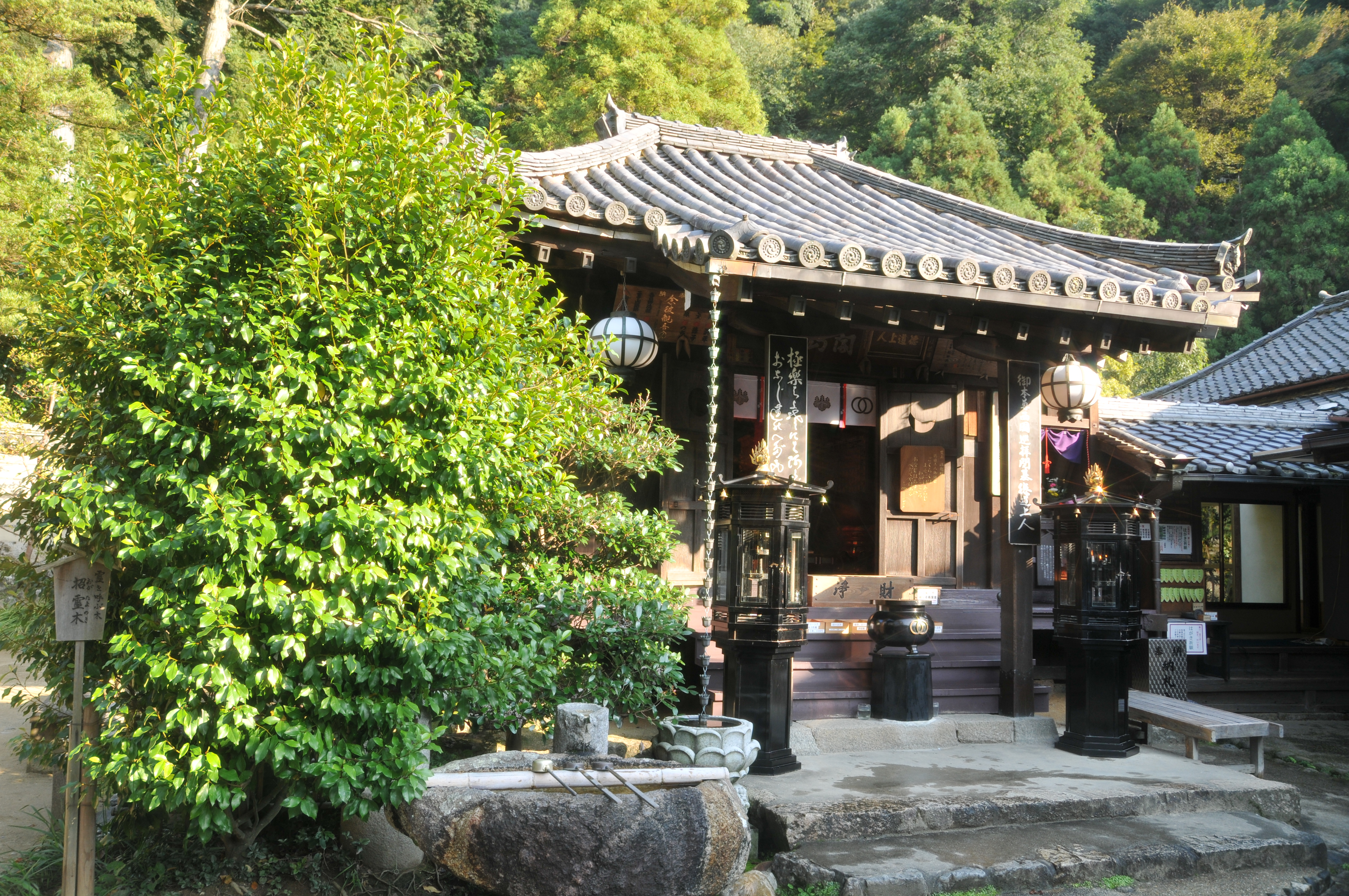
- Hōki-in Hondo

- Location within Nara Prefecture Location within Japan

Religion
- Affiliation: Buddhist
- Deity: Tokudo Shonin
- Rite: Shingon-shū Buzan-ha
- Status: functional

Location
- Location: 776 Hatsuse, Sakurai-shi, Nara-ken, 633-0112
- Coordinates: 34°31′58.15″N 135°54′35.49″E

Architecture
- Founder: c.Tokudo Shonin
- Completed: c.735

Website
- Official website
- National Important Cultural Property

Hōki-in (法起院) is a Buddhist temple located in the Hatsuse neighborhood of the city of Sakurai, Nara Prefecture, Japan. It belongs to the Shingon-shū Buzan-ha sect of Japanese Buddhism and its honzon (primary image) is a statue of Tokudo Shōnin. The temple's full name is Hase-dera Kaisan-bō Hōki-in (長谷寺 開山坊 法起院). The temple is a "bangai" (supernumerary) temple located between the 7th and 8th stops on the 33 temple Saigoku Kannon Pilgrimage route.

== History ==
Hōki-in is a sub-temple of Hase-dera. While the circumstances surrounding the founding of the temple are uncertain, according to temple legend, it was founded in 735, when the priest Tokudo Shonin, who founded the Saigoku Pilgrimage, built a thatched hut on this site. Tokudo lived in seclusion at the temple in his later years and, at the end of his life, climbed a pine tree within the temple grounds and passed away as a Bosatsu in its branches.

In 1695, during the early Edo period, the priest Eigaku, head priest of Hase-dera, rebuilt Hōki-in and designated it as the Kaisan-dō (Founder's Hall) of Hase-dera.

== Temple layout ==
Within the temple grounds is the Shonin Gomyo thirteen-story stone pagoda, said to be Tokudo's grave. The temple's main hall faces north, which is unusual for a Buddhist temple in Japan. This is because it was positioned to face the Juichimen Kannon, the principal image of Hase-dera.

Across the Hatsuse River is a Shinto shrine, the Yoki Tenman Jinja which was once the guardian shrine of Hase-dera.

== Images of the temple ==
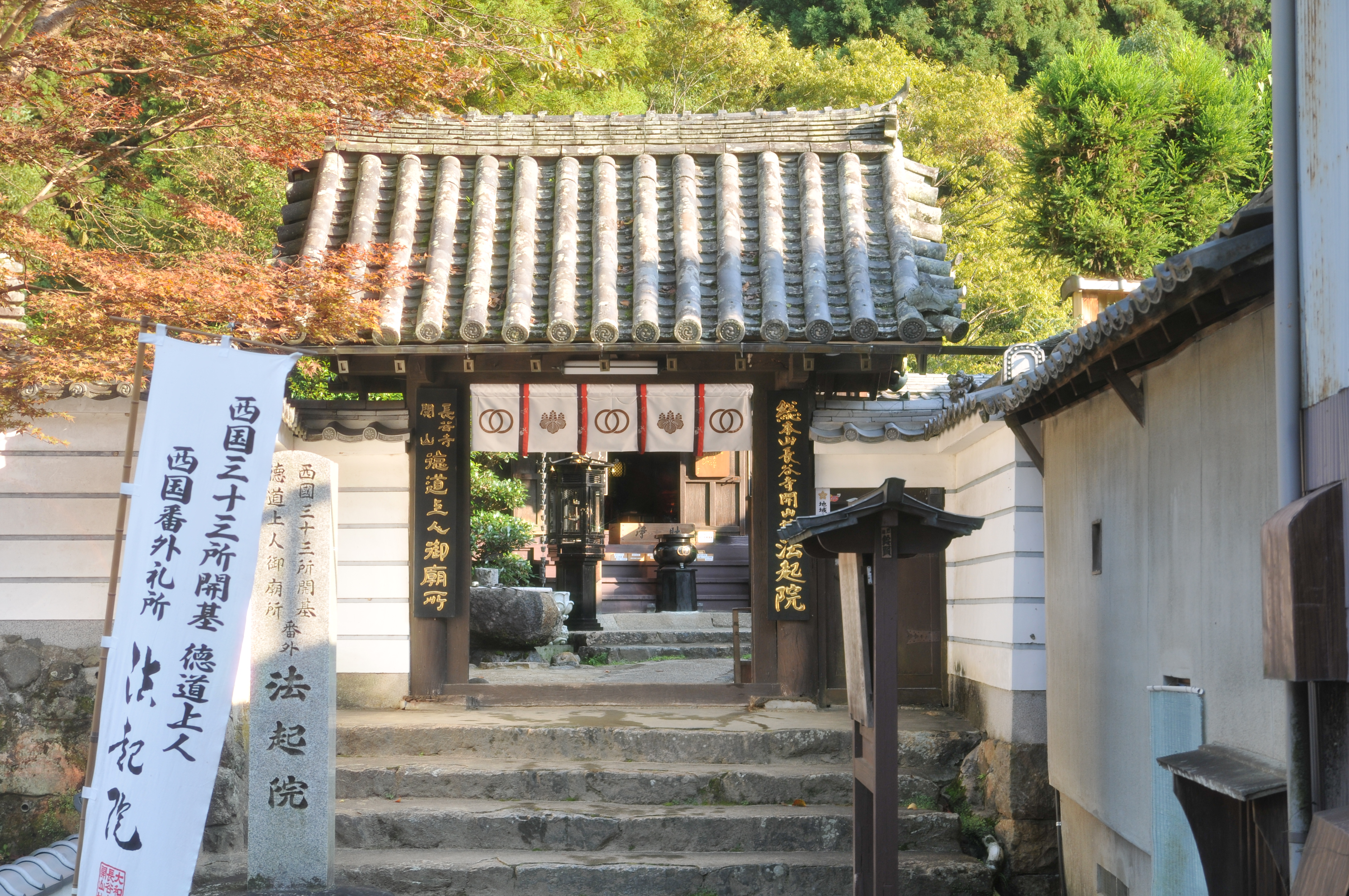
Sanmon

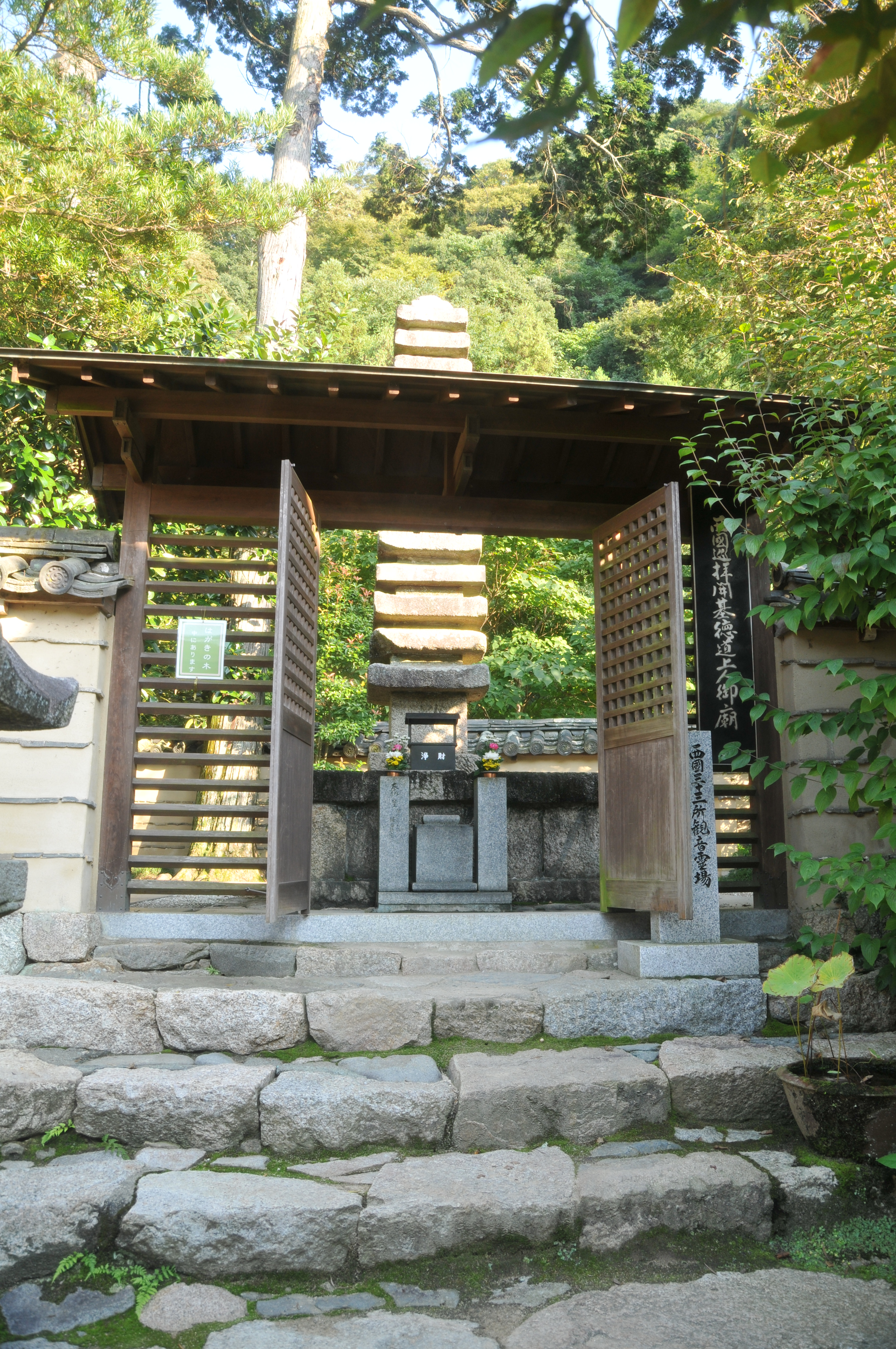
Thirteen-story pagoda, grave of Tokudo

== Access ==
The temple is approximately a 20-minute walk from Hasedera Station on the Kintetsu Osaka Line, or a three-minute walk from Hase-dera.
