= Anao-ji =

Buddhist temple in Kameoka, Kyoto, Japan

- 穴太寺
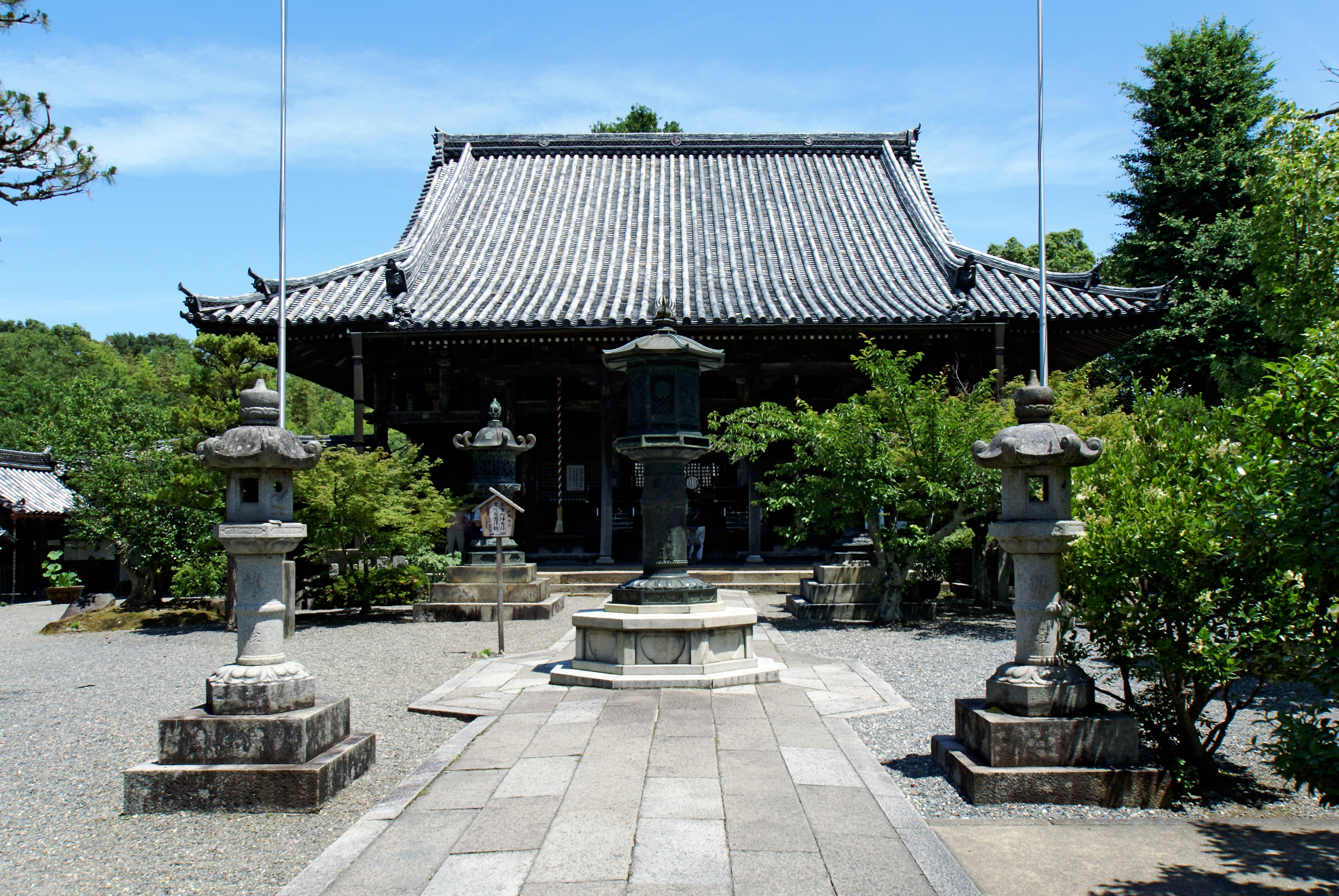
- Anao-ji Hondō

- Location within Kyoto Prefecture Location within Japan

Religion
- Affiliation: Buddhist
- Deity: Yakushi Nyorai
- Rite: Tendai
- Status: functional

Location
- Location: Sogabechō Anao, Higashi-no-tsuji, Kameoka-shi, Kyoto-fu 621-0029
- Interactive map of Anao-ji
- Coordinates: 35°0′24.03″N 135°32′57.09″E

Architecture
- Founder: c.Ōtomo no Komarō, Emperor Mommu
- Completed: c.705
- National Important Cultural Property

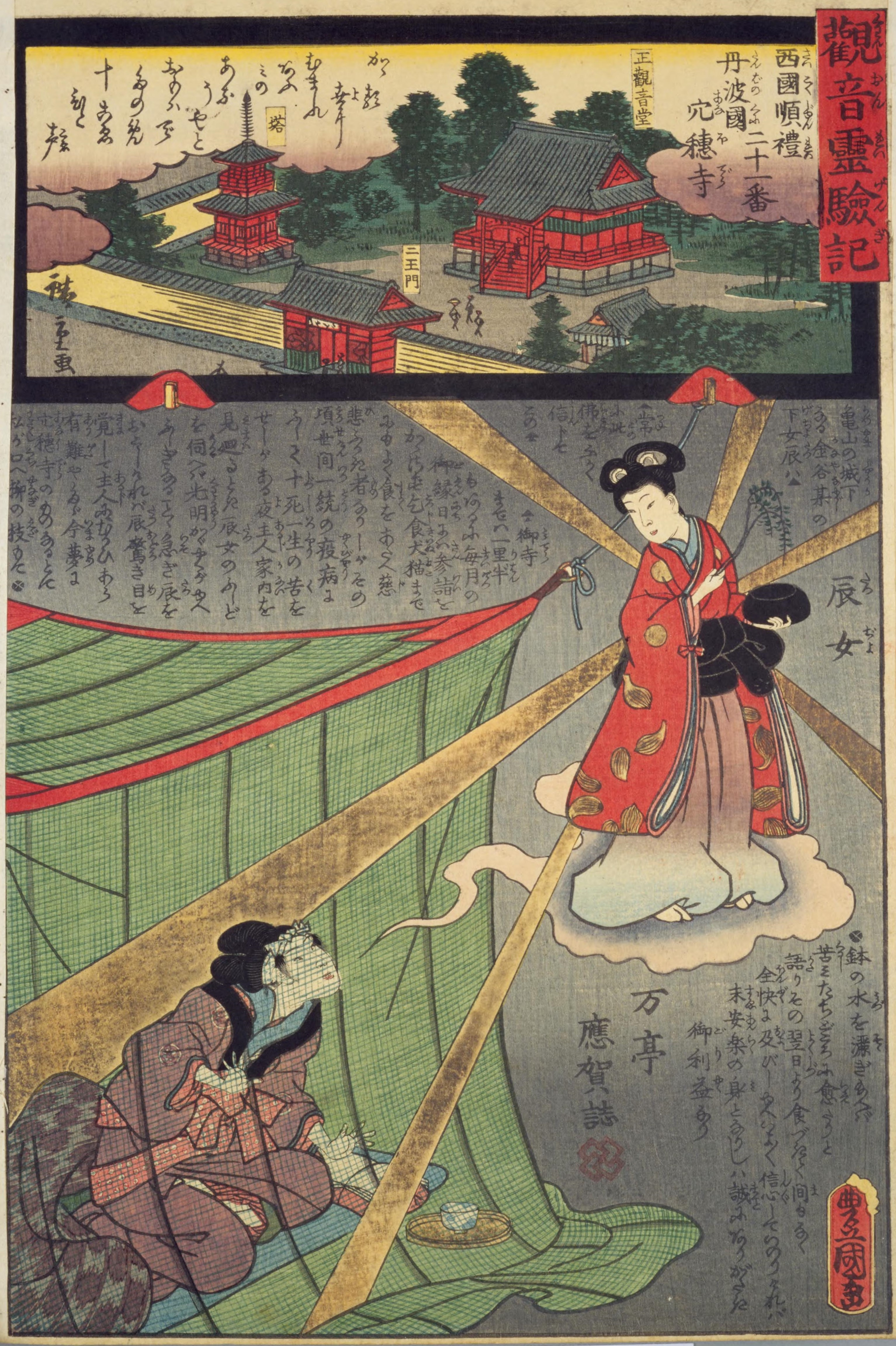
from the picture album "Kannon Reigen ki"

Anao-ji (穴太寺) is a Buddhist temple located in the Sogabechō Anao, Higashi-no-tsuji neighborhood of the city of Kameoka, Kyoto Prefecture, Japan. It belongs to the Tendai sect of Japanese Buddhism and its honzon (primary image) is a statue of Yakushi Nyorai. The temple's full name is Bōdai-san Anao-ji (菩提山 穴太寺).The temple's Shō-Kannon Bosatsu kannon statue is the 21st stop on the Saigoku Kannon Pilgrimage route.

== History ==
The origin of the temple is uncertain. According to the "Anao-ji Kannon Engi" (The Origin of the Anaoji Kannon), compiled in 1450, the temple was founded by Ōtomo no Komarō in 705 at the request of Emperor Mommu.

The Konjaku Monogatari, dating from the late Heian period, states that a man who served as the county governor of Kuwata County, in Tanba Province, commissioned a Buddhist sculptor from the capital to create a Shō-Kannon statue. As a reward, the governor gave the sculptor his prized horse. Afterwards, regretting the loss of his horse, the governor ordered his servant to shoot and kill the sculptor with a bow and arrow. However, the sculptor was later found alive and well, while the arrow was found lodged in the Shō-Kannon statue's chest. The reformed governor is said to have embraced Buddhism.

A similar story appears in the Fusō Ryakuki, where the man's name is given as "Uji Miyanari" and the sculptor's name as "Kansei." This Shō-Kannon statue survived various disasters which befell the temple over the centuries, but was stolen in November 1968.

The temple was burned down during the Ōnin War (1467-1477), and then once again during the Tenshō era (1573-1593), during Akechi Mitsuhide's attack on Tamba. The temple was rebuilt in the mid-17th century by the monk Yukihiro. The main hall burned down in 1728, but was rebuilt in 1735.

== Healing statue ==
The inner sanctuary houses a wooden statue of Shaka Nyorai, believed to have been made in the Kamakura period. A futon is placed over the statue, and it is said that if the worshipper lifts the futon and touches the part of the statue that corresponds to their own ailment, their illness will be cured.

== Use in media ==
The temple is also the setting for part of the story of Sansho the Bailiff, a 1954 Japanese period film directed by Kenji Mizoguchi based on a 1915 short story of the same name by Mori Ōgai.

== Photos of the temple ==
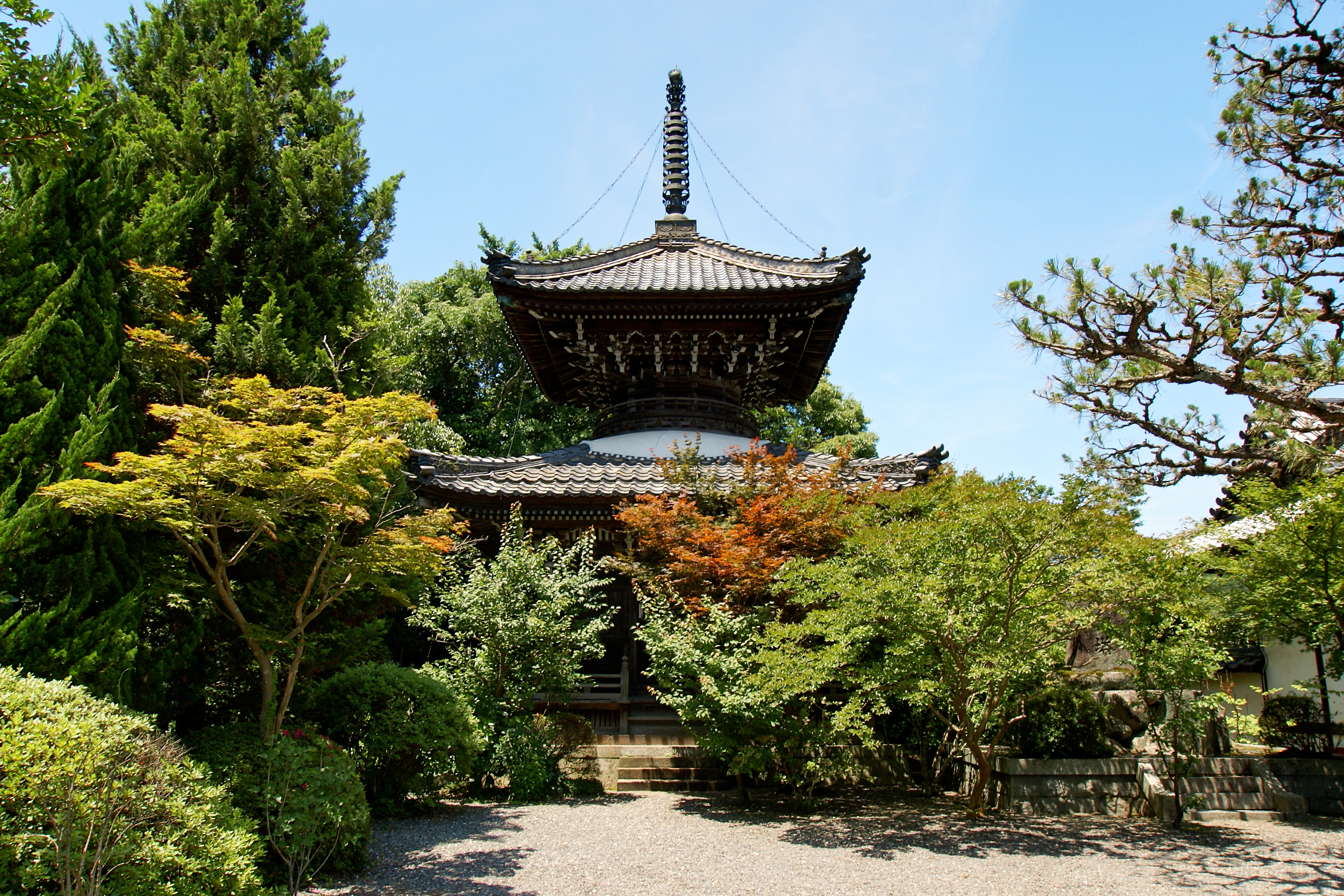
Tahō-tō

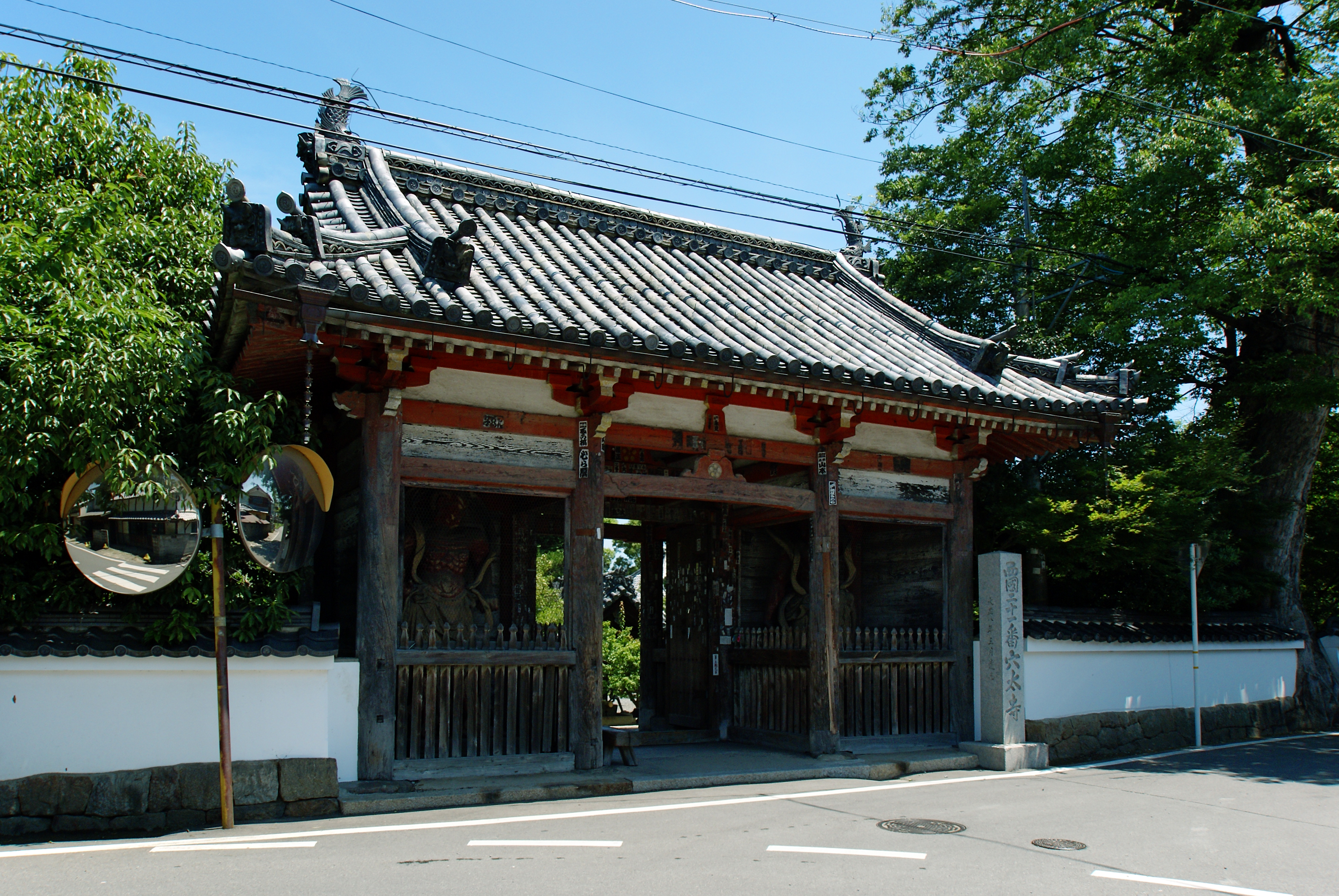
Niōmon

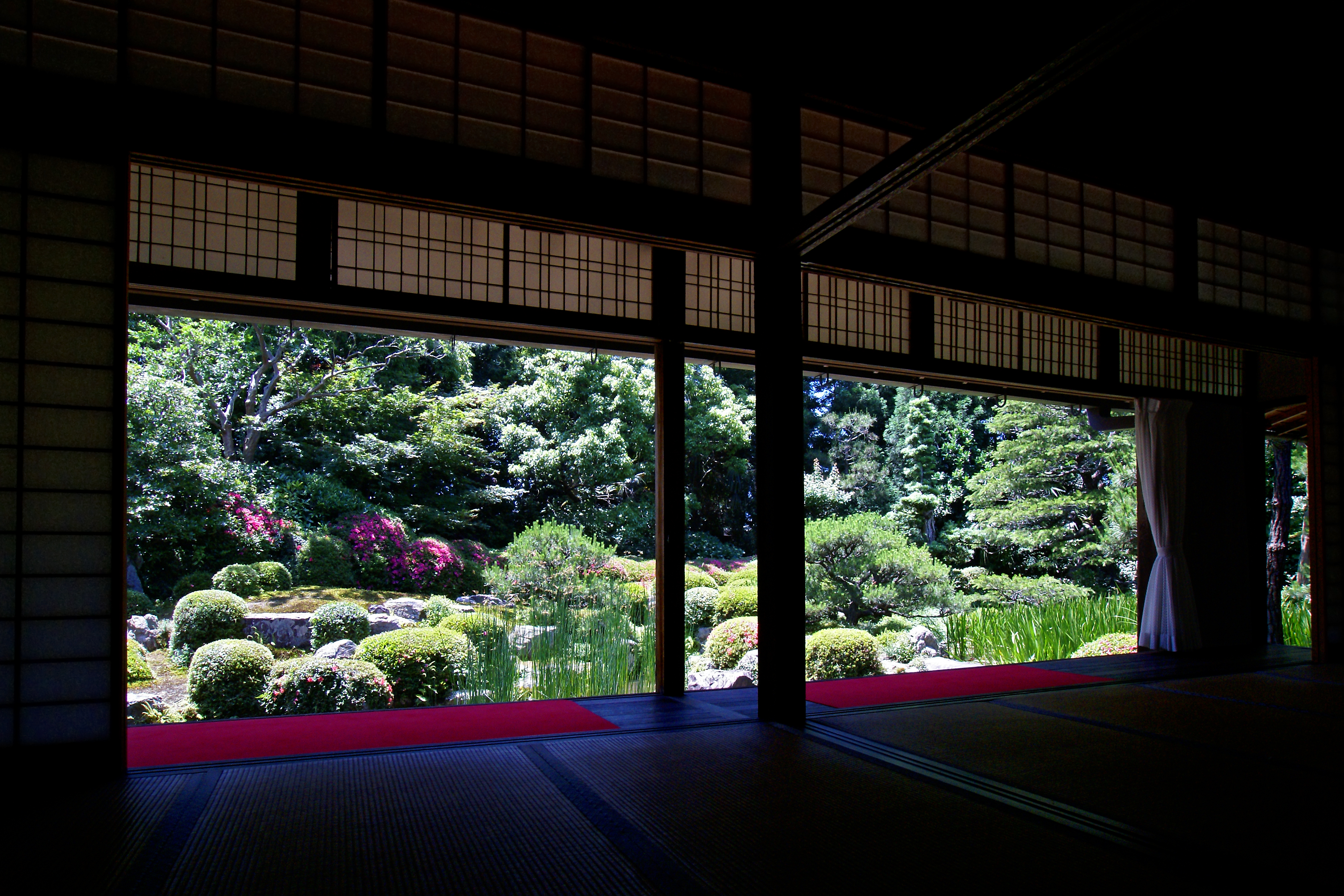
Anao-ji gardens

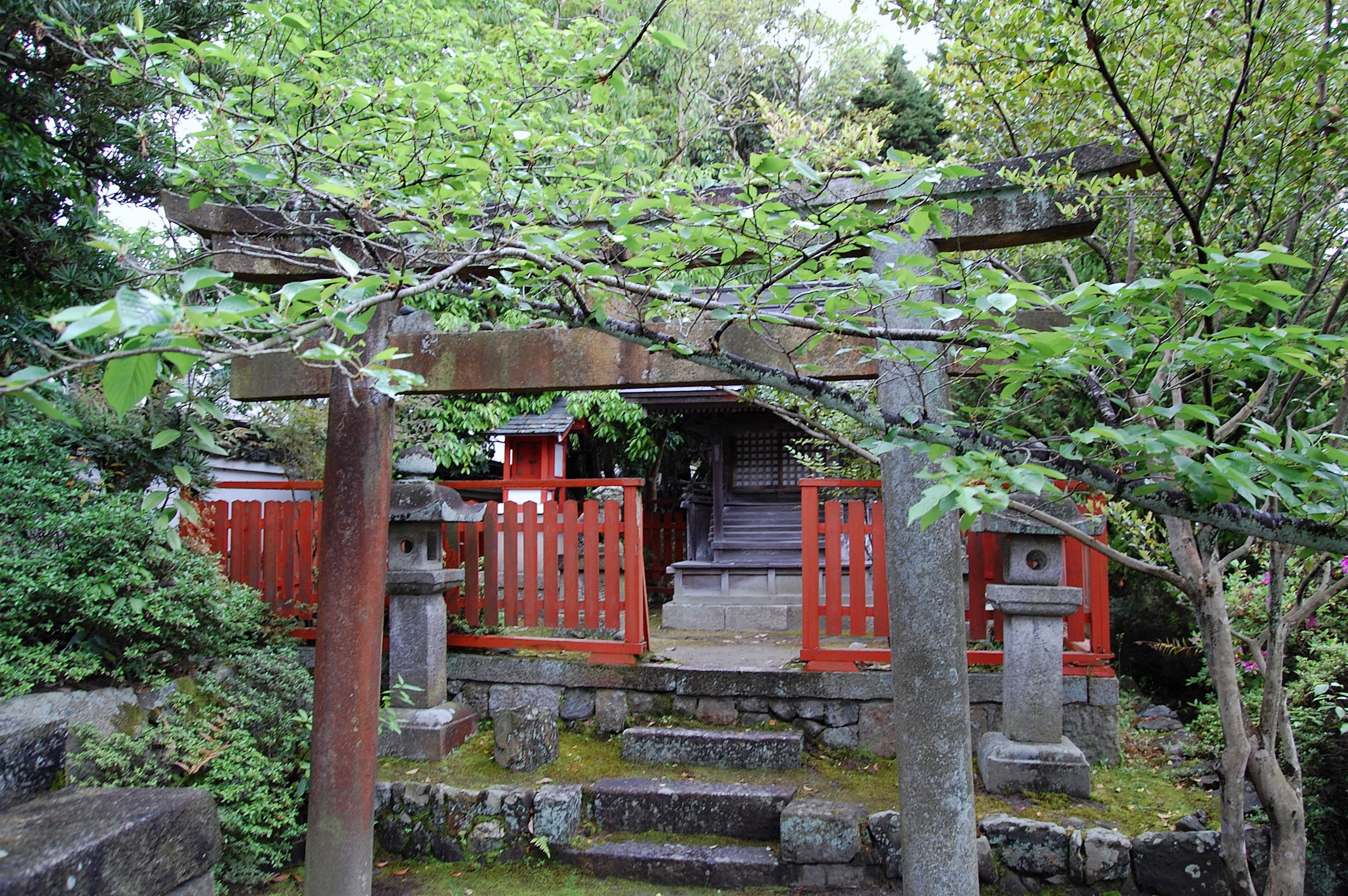
Chijū-dō

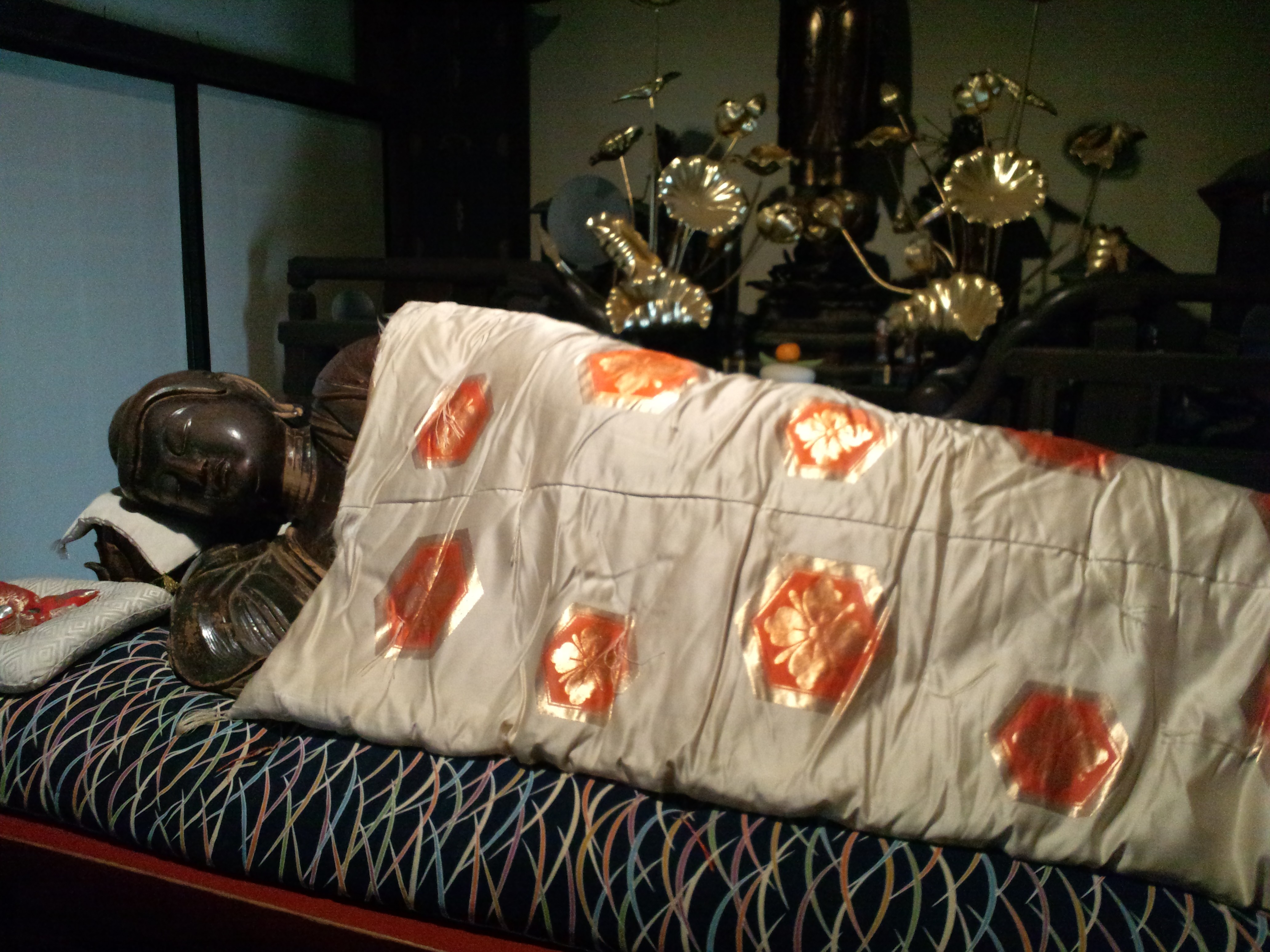
Sleeping Buddha

== Access ==
The temple is approximately 4.6 kilometers southwest of Kameoka Station on the JR West JR Kyoto Line San'in Main Line (Sagano Line).

== Cultural Properties ==
=== National Important Cultural Properties ===
- Wooden statue of standing Shō-Kannon (木造聖観音立像（伝・感世作), Kamakura period; attributed to Kansei. Stolen in November 1968, it has never been recovered

=== Kyoto Prefectural Designated Tangible Cultural Properties ===
- Hondō (本堂), Edo period;
- Tahōtō (本堂), Edo period;
- Anao-ji Kannon Engi Emaki (太寺観音縁起), Nanboku-cho-Edo period;

=== Kyoto Prefectural Registered Tangible Cultural Properties ===
- Nenbutsu-dō (念仏堂), Niōmon (仁王門), Hōjō/Kuri (方丈庫裏), Hōjō rear gate (方丈庫裏), Shōrō (鐘楼), Chinjū-dō (鎮守堂), Edo period;
- Silk Painting of Shaka Nyorai and 16 attendants (絹本着色釈迦十六善神像), Kamakura period;

=== Kyoto Prefectural Place of Scenic Beauty ===
- Anao-ji Gardens (穴太寺庭園),

=== Kyoto Prefectural Historic Site ===
- Anao-ji Precincts (穴太寺境),

=== Kameoka City Tangible Cultural Properties ===
- Wooden Nehan Shaka statue (木造釈迦涅槃像), Kamakura period;.
