= Saigoku Kannon Pilgrimage =

Buddhist temple pilgrimage route in Kansai, Japan

The Saigoku Kannon Pilgrimage (西国三十三所, Saigoku Sanjūsan-sho) is a pilgrimage of thirty-three Buddhist temples throughout the Kansai region of Japan, similar to the Shikoku Pilgrimage. In addition to the official thirty-three temples, there are an additional three known as bangai (番外). The principal image in each temple is Kannon, known to Westerners as the Bodhisattva of Compassion (sometimes translated as 'Goddess of Mercy'); however, there is some variation among the images and the powers they possess.

It is traditional for pilgrims to wear white clothing and conical straw hats and to carry walking sticks. While the route was historically traveled by foot, today pilgrims usually use cars or trains. Pilgrims record their progress with a prayer book (納経帖, Nōkyō-chō), which the temple staff mark with red stamps and Japanese calligraphy indicating the temple number, the temple name, and the specific name of the Kannon image. Some pilgrims receive the stamps and calligraphy on wall scrolls (for a decorative hanging) and on their white coats (to be cremated in) as well.

The goeika songs of the 33 temples are widely known and frequently grouped together.

No.	Temple	Honzon (main image)	City/Ward/Town	Prefecture	Image	Coordinates
1	Seiganto-ji (青岸渡寺)	Nyoirin Kannon (Cintāmani-cakra)	Nachikatsuura	Wakayama	Seiganto-ji	33°40′9.15″N 135°53′23.31″E
2	Kimii-dera (紀三井寺)	Jūichimen Kannon (Ekādaśamukha)	Wakayama	Wakayama	Ki-mii-dera	34.185167°N 135.190025°E
3	Kokawa-dera (粉河寺)	Senju Kannon (Sahasra-bhuja Sahasra-netra)	Kinokawa	Wakayama	Kokawa-dera	34.280961°N 135.405908°E
4	Sefuku-ji (施福寺)	Senju Kannon (Sahasra-bhuja Sahasra-netra)	Izumi	Osaka	Sefuku-ji	34.392908°N 135.511578°E
5	Fujii-dera (葛井寺)	Senju Kannon (Sahasra-bhuja Sahasra-netra)	Fujiidera	Osaka	Fujii-dera	34.570186°N 135.596556°E
6	Minamihokke-ji (Tsubosaka-dera) (南法華寺)	Senju Kannon (Sahasra-bhuja Sahasra-netra)	Takatori	Nara	Minamihokke-ji (Tsubosaka-dera)	34.426417°N 135.809861°E
7	Oka-dera (岡寺)	Nyoirin Kannon (Cintāmani-cakra)	Asuka	Nara	Oka-dera	34.471789°N 135.828372°E
Bangai	Hōki-in (法起院)		Sakurai	Nara	Hōki-in	34.532819°N 135.909858°E
8	Hase-dera (長谷寺)	Jūichimen Kannon (Ekādaśamukha)	Sakurai	Nara	Hase-dera	34.535894°N 135.906825°E
9	Nan'endō (Kofuku-ji) (南円堂)	Fukūkenjaku Kannon (Amoghapāśa)	Nara	Nara	Nan'endō	34.6825°N 135.830278°E
10	Mimuroto-ji (三室戸寺)	Senju Kannon (Sahasra-bhuja)	Uji	Kyoto	Mimuroto-ji	34.900478°N 135.819194°E
11	Kami Daigo-ji (醍醐寺)	Juntei Kannon (Cundi)	Fushimi-ku, Kyoto	Kyoto	Kami Daigo-ji	34.950992°N 135.819586°E
12	Shōhō-ji (Iwama-dera) (正法寺)	Senju Kannon (Sahasra-bhuja)	Otsu	Shiga	Shōhō-ji (Iwama-dera)	34.933°N 135.878389°E
13	Ishiyama-dera (石山寺)	Nyoirin Kannon (Cintāmani-cakra)	Otsu	Shiga	Ishiyama-dera	34.960419°N 135.905625°E
14	Mii-dera (三井寺)	Nyoirin Kannon (Cintāmani-cakra)	Otsu	Shiga	Mii-dera	35.013358°N 135.85285°E
Bangai	Gankei-ji (元慶寺)		Kyoto	Kyoto	Gankei-ji	34.988639°N 135.801167°E
15	Imakumano Kannon-ji (今熊野観音寺)	Jūichimen Kannon (Ekādaśamukha)	Higashiyama-ku, Kyoto	Kyoto	Imakumano Kannon-ji	34.979706°N 135.780842°E
16	Kiyomizu-dera (清水寺)	Senju Kannon (Sahasra-bhuja Sahasra-netra)	Higashiyama-ku, Kyoto	Kyoto	Kiyomizu-dera	34.994831°N 135.785003°E
17	Rokuharamitsu-ji (六波羅蜜寺)	Jūichimen Kannon (Ekādaśamukha)	Higashiyama-ku, Kyoto	Kyoto	Rokuharamitsu-ji	34.997103°N 135.773308°E
18	Chōhō-ji (Rokkaku-dō) (頂法寺)	Nyoirin Kannon (Cintāmani-cakra)	Nakagyo-ku, Kyoto	Kyoto	Chōhō-ji (Rokkaku-dō)	35.007222°N 135.760278°E
19	Gyōgan-ji (Kōdō) (行願寺)	Senju Kannon (Sahasra-bhuja)	Nakagyo-ku, Kyoto	Kyoto	Gyōgan-ji (Kōdō)	35.0163°N 135.767761°E
20	Yoshimine-dera (善峯寺)	Senju Kannon (Sahasra-bhuja)	Nishikyo-ku	Kyoto	Yoshimine-dera	34.938167°N 135.644194°E
21	Anao-ji (穴太寺)	Shō Kannon (Aryavalokitesvara)	Kameoka	Kyoto	Anao-ji	35.006675°N 135.549192°E
22	Sōji-ji (総持寺)	Senju Kannon (Sahasra-bhuja)	Ibaraki	Osaka	Sōji-ji (Osaka)	34.829103°N 135.581569°E
23	Katsuō-ji (勝尾寺)	Senju Kannon (Sahasra-bhuja)	Minoh	Osaka	Katsuō-ji	34.865833°N 135.491111°E
24	Nakayama-dera (中山寺)	Jūichimen Kannon (Ekādaśamukha)	Takarazuka	Hyōgo	Nakayama-dera	34.821667°N 135.367667°E
Bangai	Bodai-ji (菩提寺)		Sanda	Hyōgo	Bodai-ji	34.940389°N 135.2405°E
25	Kiyomizu-dera (清水寺)	Senju Kannon (Sahasra-bhuja)	Katō	Hyōgo	Bansyu Kiyomizudera	34.972494°N 135.081822°E
26	Ichijō-ji (一乗寺)	Shō Kannon (Aryavalokitesvara)	Kasai	Hyōgo	Ichijō-ji	34.859308°N 134.819025°E
27	Engyō-ji (圓教寺)	Nyoirin Kannon (Cintāmani-cakra)	Himeji	Hyōgo	Engyō-ji	34.891139°N 134.658139°E
28	Nariai-ji (成相寺)	Shō Kannon (Aryavalokitesvara)	Miyazu	Kyoto	Nariai-ji	35.595439°N 135.187372°E
29	Matsunoo-dera (松尾寺)	Batō Kannon (Hayagrīva)	Maizuru	Kyoto	Matsunoo-dera	35.497428°N 135.469375°E
30	Hōgon-ji (宝厳寺)	Senju Kannon (Sahasra-bhuja Sahasra-netra)	Nagahama	Shiga	Hōgon-ji	35.421122°N 136.143225°E
31	Chōmei-ji (長命寺)	Senju Kannon; Jūichimen Kannon; Shō Kannon	Ōmihachiman	Shiga	Chōmei-ji	35.162683°N 136.064003°E
32	Kannonshō-ji (観音正寺)	Senju Kannon (Sahasra-bhuja Sahasra-netra)	Ōmihachiman	Shiga	Kannonshō-ji	35.144667°N 136.161028°E
33	Kegon-ji (華厳寺)	Jūichimen Kannon (Ekādaśamukha)	Ibigawa	Gifu	Kegon-ji	35.537372°N 136.607897°E

== See also ==
- Japan 100 Kannon, pilgrimage composed of the Saigoku, Bandō and Chichibu pilgrimages
  - Bandō 33 Kannon, pilgrimage in the Kantō region
  - Chichibu 34 Kannon, pilgrimage in Saitama Prefecture
- Shikoku Pilgrimage, 88 Temple pilgrimage in the Shikoku island
- Musashino Kannon Pilgrimage, pilgrimage in Tokyo and Saitama prefectures
- Chūgoku 33 Kannon, pilgrimage in the Chūgoku region
- Kannon
- Buddhism in Japan
- Tourism in Japan
