= Shōhō-ji (Ōtsu) =

Buddhist temple in Ōtsu, Shiga, Japan

- 正法寺
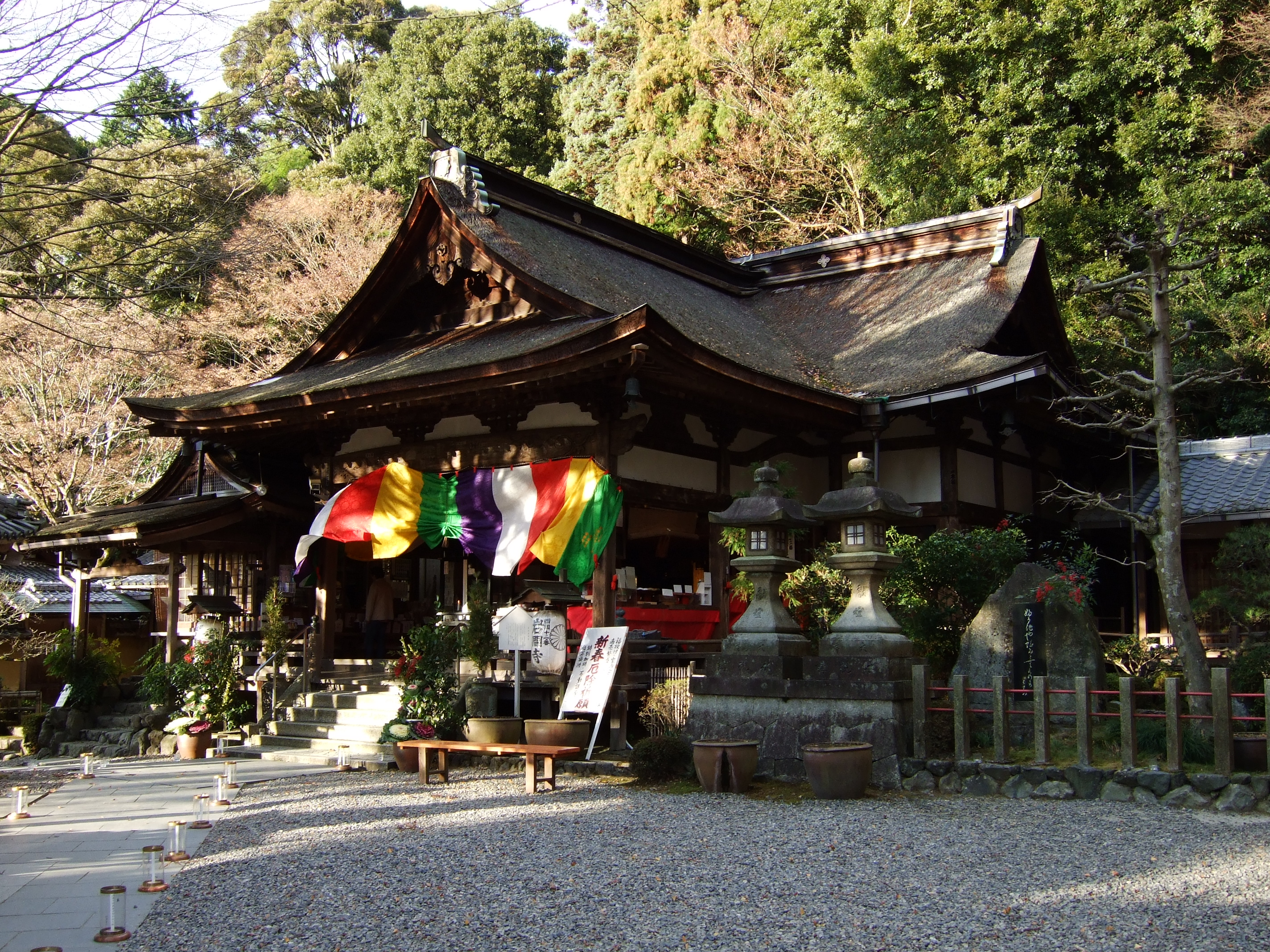
- Shōhō-ji Hondō

- Location within Shiga Prefecture Location within Japan

Religion
- Affiliation: Buddhist
- Deity: Senjū Kannon
- Rite: Shingon-shū Daigoji-ha
- Status: functional

Location
- Location: 82 Ishiyamauchihatachō, Ōtsu-shi, Shiga-ken 520-0869
- Coordinates: 34°55′58.8″N 135°52′42.2″E

Architecture
- Founder: Taichō, Empress Genshō
- Completed: c722

Website
- Official website
- National Important Cultural Property

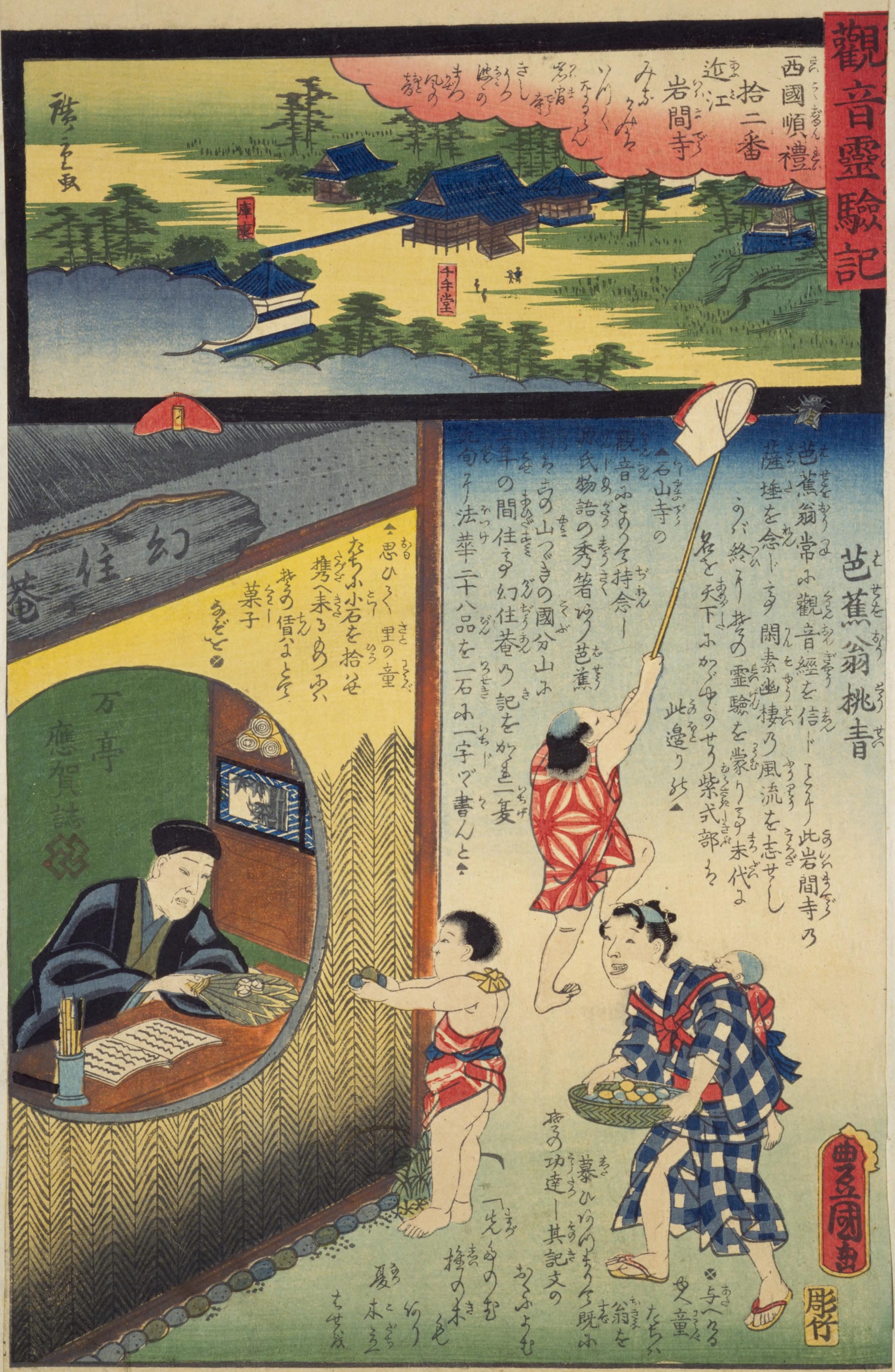
from the picture album "Kannon Reigen ki"

Shōhō-ji (正法寺) is a Buddhist temple located in the Ishiyamauchihatachō neighborhood of the city of Ōtsu, Shiga Prefecture, Japan. It belongs to the Shingon-shū Daigoji-ha sect of Japanese Buddhism and its honzon (primary image) is a statue of Senjū Kannon Bosatsu (Sahasrabhuja). The temple's full name is Iwama-san Shōhō-ji (岩間山 正法寺), but the temple is also popularly known as the Iwama-dera. The temple is the 12th stop on the 33 temple Saigoku Kannon Pilgrimage route.

== History ==
The origin of this temple is uncertain. According to the temple's legend, in 722, Taichō, who had prayed for Empress Genshō's recovery, discerned a holy force in a Katsura tree on Mount Iwama. He carved a life-sized statue of Senjū Kannon from within its living wood, within which he enshrined the emperor's personal Buddha, a gilt-bronze Senjū Kannon statue, founding the temple at the request of Emperor Genshō. This statue, approximately 15-cm tall, is currently housed in a three-story altar in the main hall and is a hibutsu (hidden/secret image). According to myth, every night at sunset, the statue escapes from its altar and travels through the 136 hells to save people, returning to Mount Iwama at sunrise drenched in sweat, earning it the nickname the "Sweating Kannon."

The doors concealing the image were reopened in 1990 for the first time in 365 years, and again from 2009 to 2010 during the "Saigoku Thirty-Three Temple Opening Ceremony" to commemorate the 1,000th anniversary of the death of cloistered Emperor Kazan.

Little is known about the history of the temple, except that it was patronized by Emperor Go-Shirakawa, Emperor Go-Uda and Emperor Ōgimachi. The current Main Hall was rebuilt in 1577; it was dismantled and repaired during the Kan'ei era (1624–1643).

== Images of the temple ==
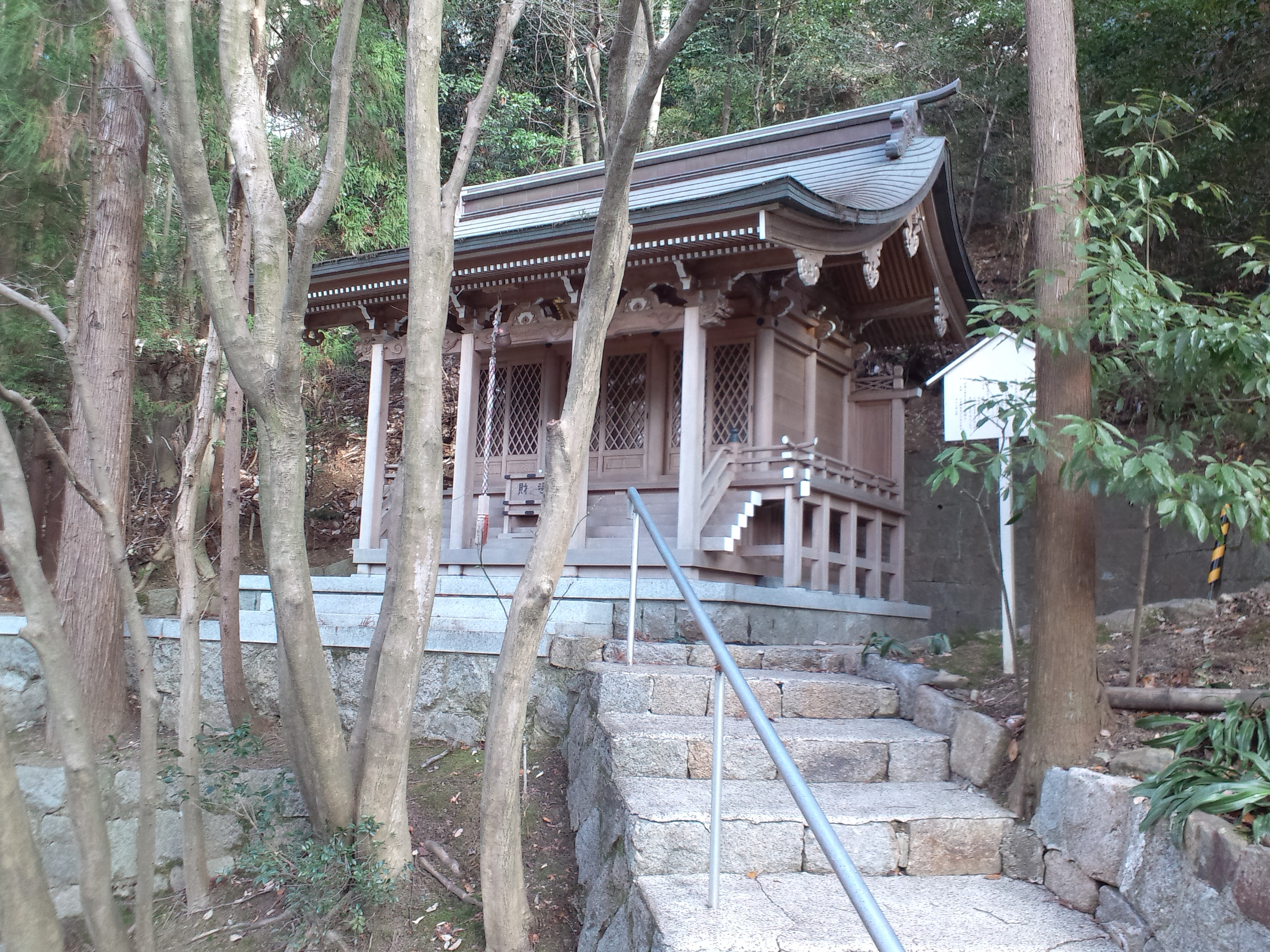
Gosha Gongen-do

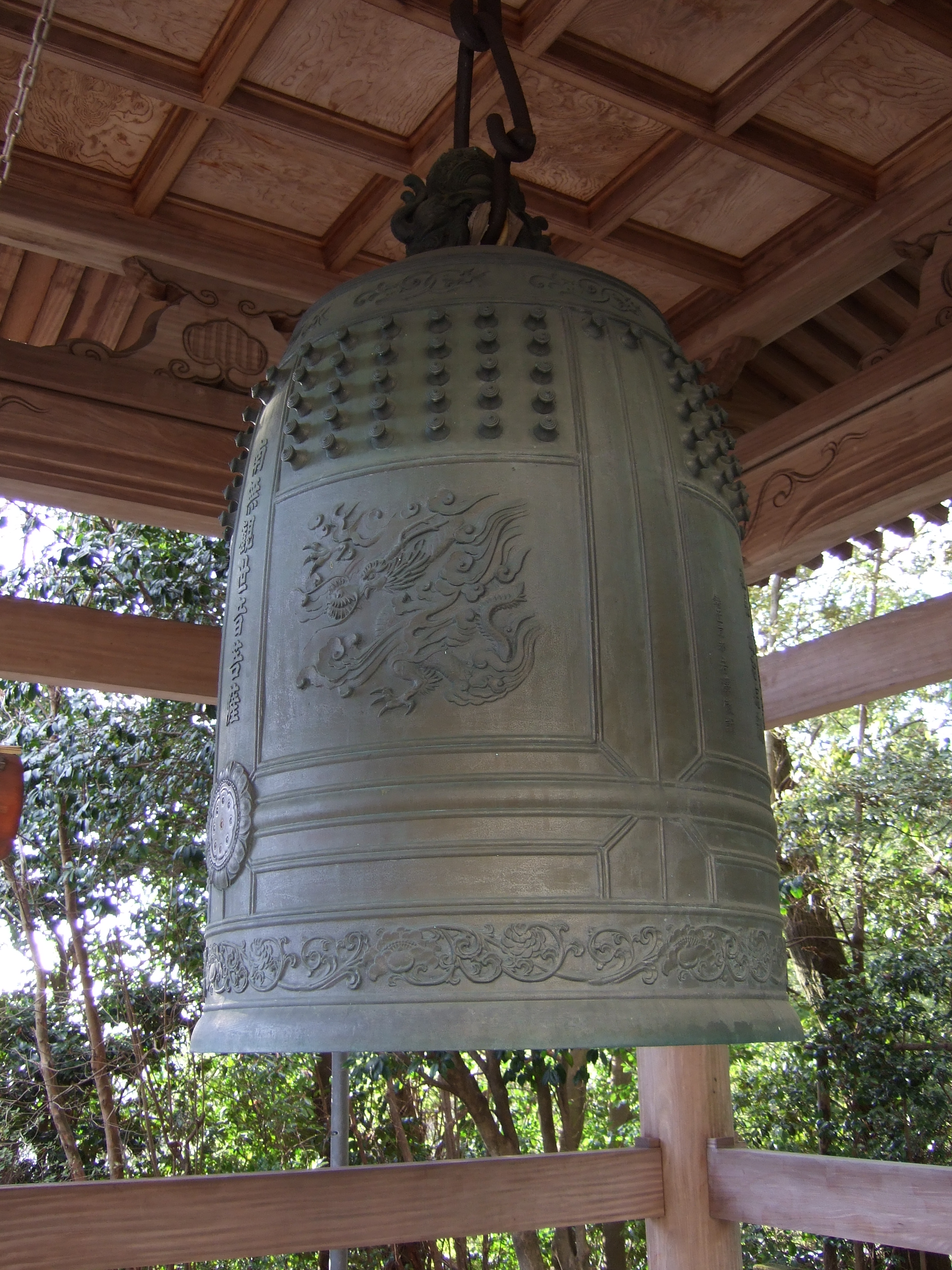
Bell

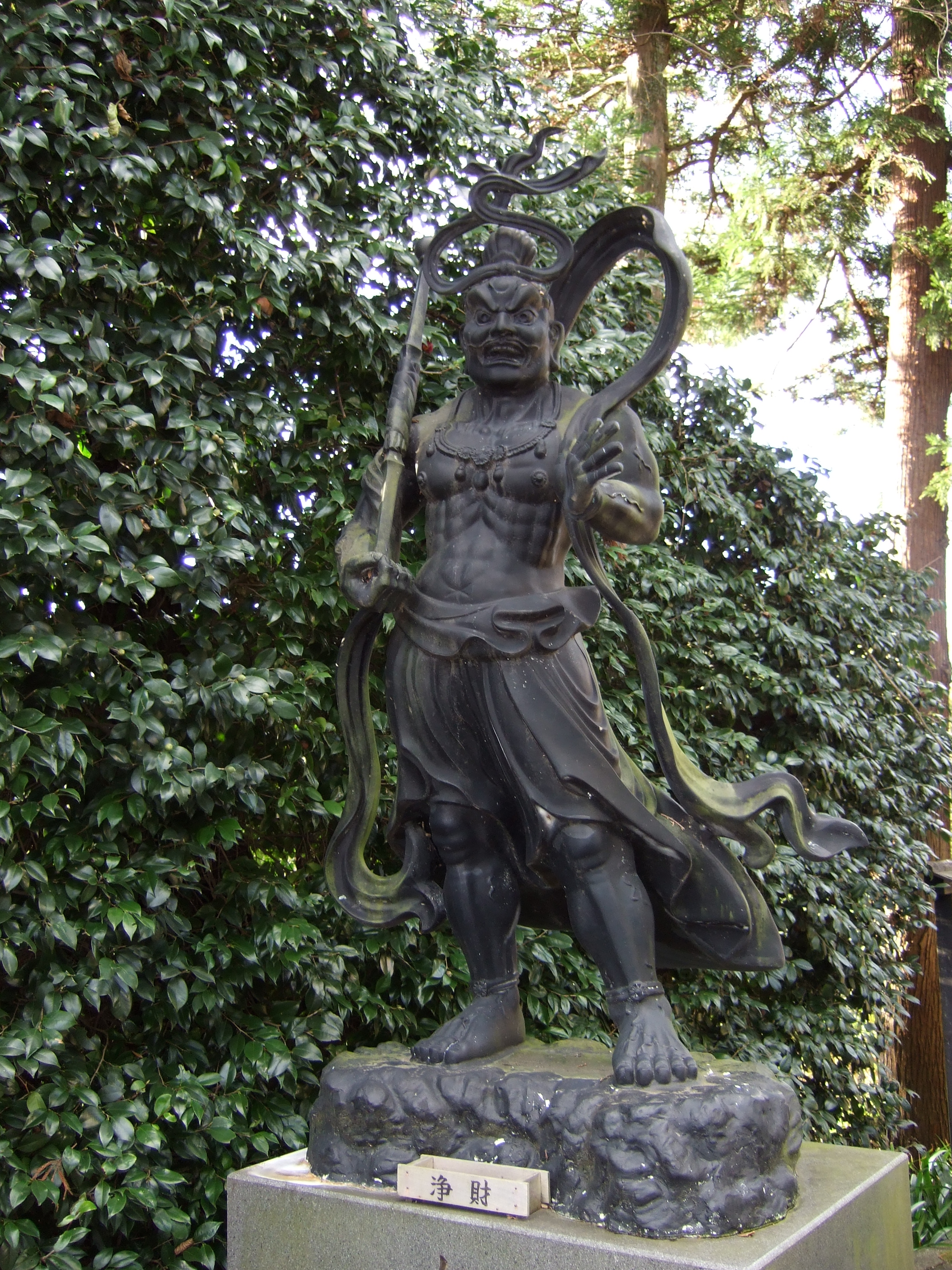
Niō

== Access ==
The temple is approximately six kilometers southwest from Ishiyamadera Station on the Keihan Railway

== Cultural Properties ==
=== National Important Cultural Properties ===
- Wooden statue of standing Jizō Bosatsu (木造地蔵菩薩立像), Heian period;
- Wooden statues of standing Fudō-Myōō and attendants (木造不動明王二童子立像 3躯), Kamakura period;

=== Ōtsu City Designated Tangible Cultural Properties ===
- Wooden statue of seated Yakushi Nyorai (木造薬師如来坐像), Heian period;
- Wooden statue of standing Jūichimen Kannon (木造十一面観音立像), Heian period;
- Kakebotoke (懸仏), Kamakura period; Set of two
