= Gyōgan-ji =

Buddhist temple in Nakagyō-ku, Kyoto, Japan

- 行願寺
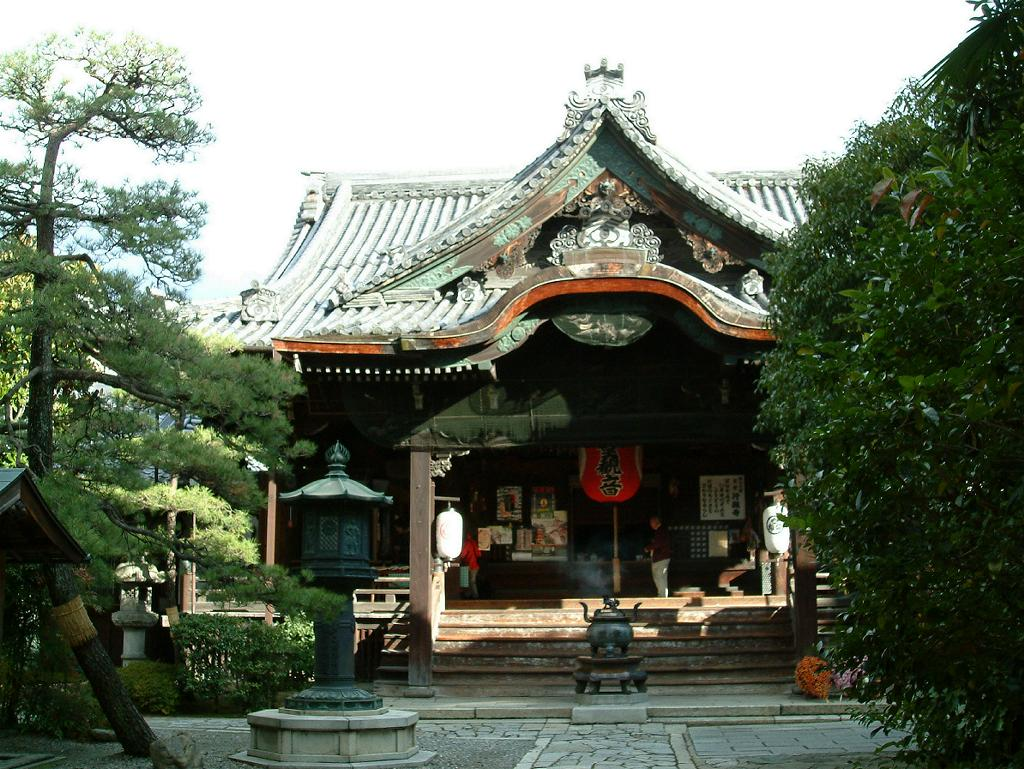
- Gyōgan-ji Hondō

- Location within Kyoto Prefecture Location within Japan

Religion
- Affiliation: Buddhist
- Deity: Senjū Kannon Bosatsu
- Rite: Tendai
- Status: functional

Location
- Location: Monzencho, Teramachi-dori, Takeya-cho, Nakagyo-ku, Kyoto-shi, Kyoto-fu 604-0991
- Interactive map of Gyōgan-ji
- Coordinates: 35°0′58.68″N 135°46′3.94″E

Architecture
- Founder: Gyōen
- Completed: 1004

Website
- Official website
- National Important Cultural Property

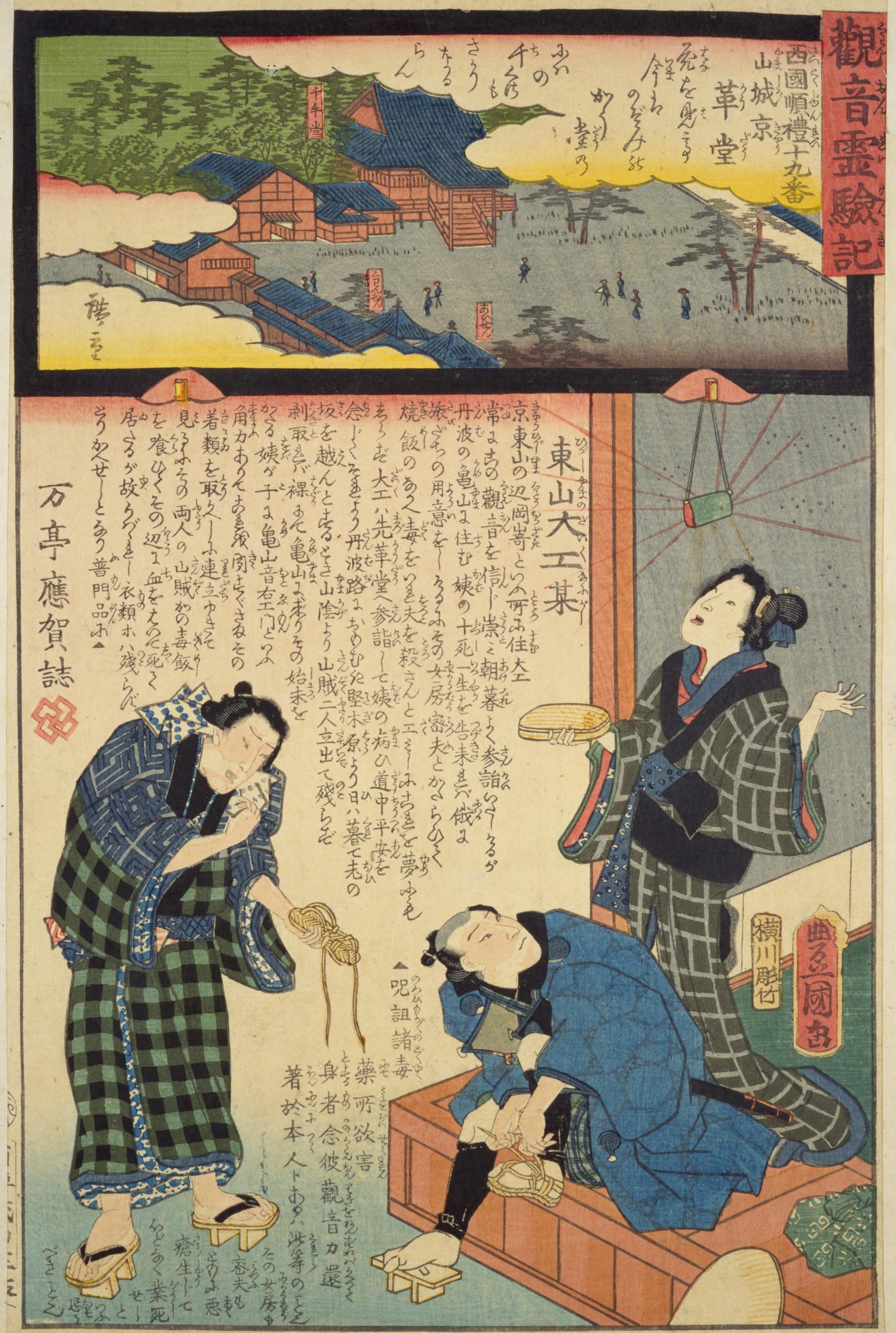
from the picture album "Kannon Reigen ki"

Gyōgan-ji (行願寺) is a Buddhist temple located in the Monzencho, Teramachi-dori, Takeya-cho neighborhood of Nakagyō-ku, Kyoto, Japan. It belongs to the Tendai sect of Japanese Buddhism and its honzon is a statue of Sunjū Kannon Bosatsu. The temple's full name is Reiyu-san Kōdō Gyōgan-ji (霊麀山 革堂 行願寺). The temple is the 19th stop on the Saigoku Kannon Pilgrimage route.

== Overview ==
The origin of this temple is certain. According to the Hyakurensho and Nihon Kiryaku, this temple was founded in 1004 by Gyōen, who rebuilt the Ichijō Hokuhen-dō on its original site in Ichijō-Ogawa in Heian-kyō and renamed it Gyōgan-ji. Regarding Ichijō Hokuhen-dō, the Nihon Kiryaku records in the entry for August 13, 989, that the "Ichijō Hokuhen-dō collapsed," confirming its existence before the temple's founding. Before entering the Buddhist priesthood, Gyōen was a hunter by profession. One day, after shooting a pregnant doe in the mountains, he witnessed a fawn being born from the deer's belly. This led him to realize the wrongness of killing and to enter the Buddhist priesthood. Because Gyōen always wore the deer skin, he was known as the "Skin Saint" or "Leather Saint," and thus the temple was named "Kōdō" (革堂), Gyōen's birth and death dates are unknown, but he is believed to have been trained on Mount Hiei. Fujiwara no Akinobu, son of Fujiwara no Michinaga, shaved his head and became a monk under Gyōen in 1012.

In 1140, the temple's Tahōtō pagoda was destroyed by lightning. It was subsequently rebuilt, but in 1151, was destroyed in a fire which destroyed most of the temple. The temple burned down again in 1242, after a resident monk set fire to it. Due to Toyotomi Hideyoshi's urban planning, the temple was relocated to Teramachi Kojinguchi (present-day Kamigyo-ku, Kyoto, east of the Kyoto Imperial Palace) in 1590. After the Kyoto Great Fire of 1708, it was relocated again to its current location, slightly south of its original location at Teramachi Kojinguchi.The current Hondō was constructed in 1815 and its shōrō belfry dates from 1804.

In recent years, the temple has provided feeding and shelter for local cats, and is also known as the "Cat Temple." The temple uses sales of merchandise and donations to cover food costs.

=== Ghost Ema legend ===
One votive plaque has the following legend: Toward the end of the Edo period, a babysitter named Obun, who worked at a pawnshop near Gyōgan-ji, began humming a familiar Buddhist hymn as a lullaby, and even her child eventually memorized it. The pawnshop owner, a devout believer in the Lotus Sutra, discovered this and had Obun tortured and killed. The panicked owner hid Obun's body in his storehouse and pretended not to know anything about it. When Obun's parents were holding a wake at Gyōgan-ji, her ghost appeared and told them what had happened, revealing the truth and leading to the pawnshop owner's arrest. The votive tablet depicts Obun's beloved hand mirror.

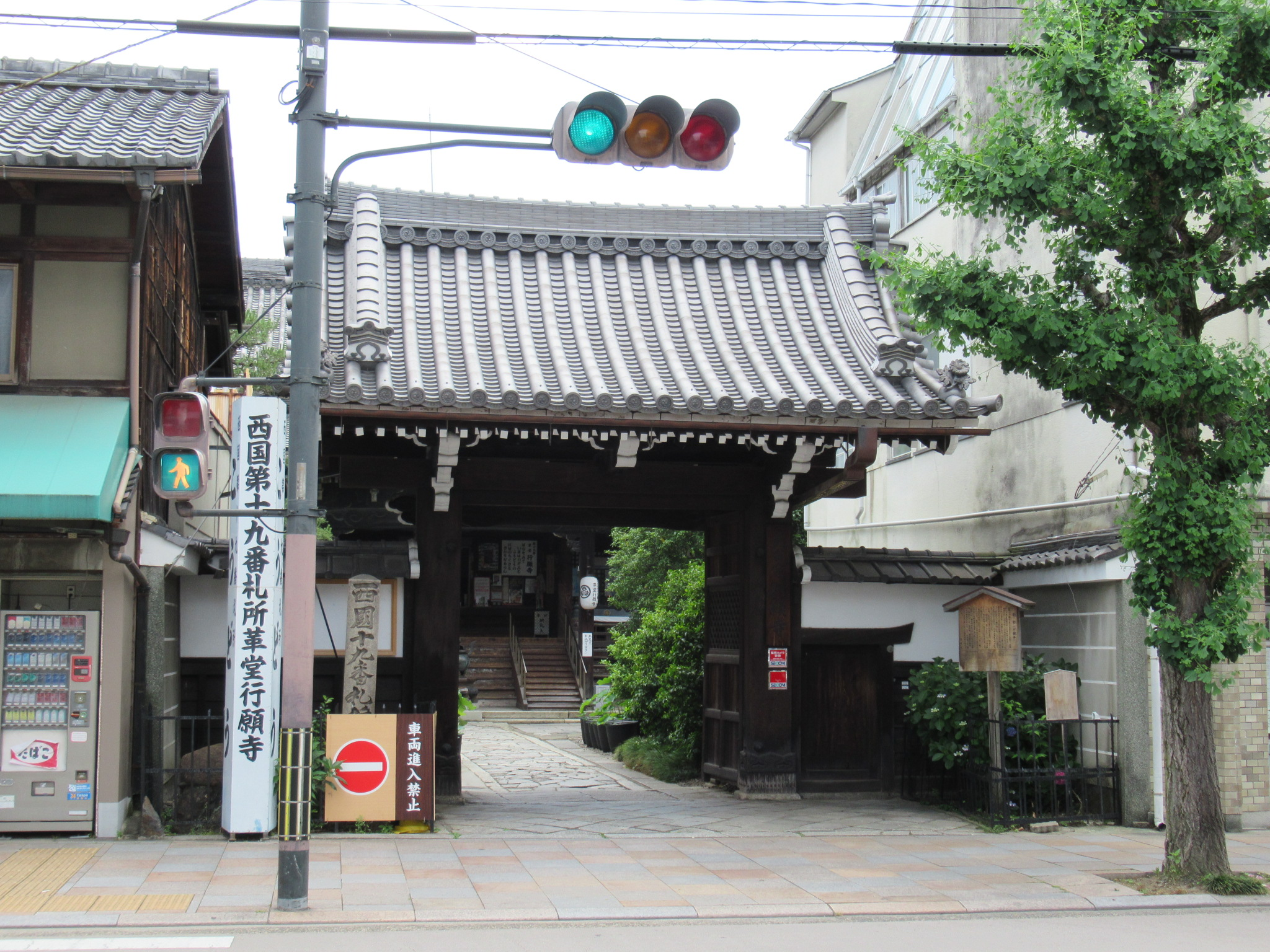
Sanmon

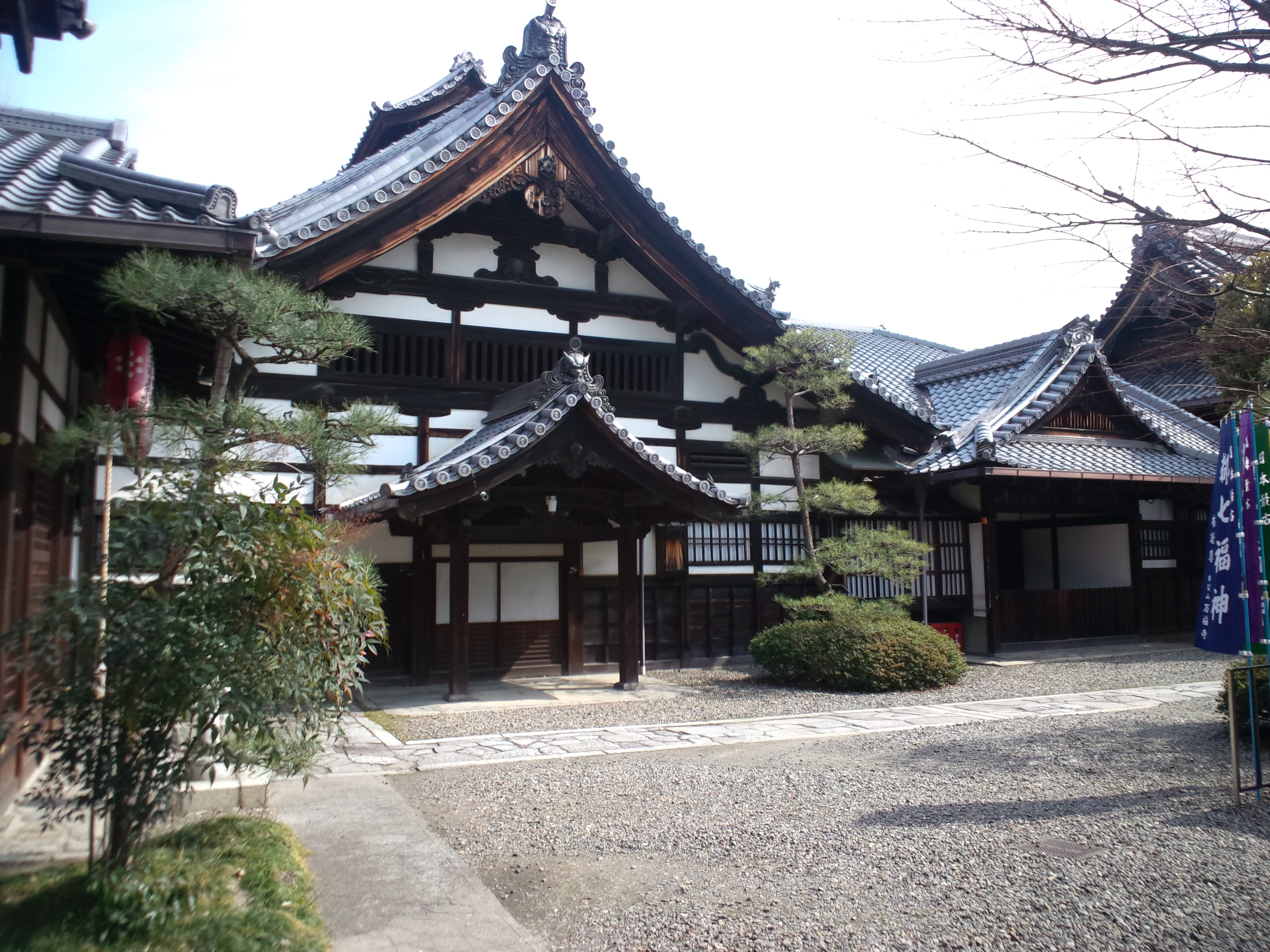
Kuri

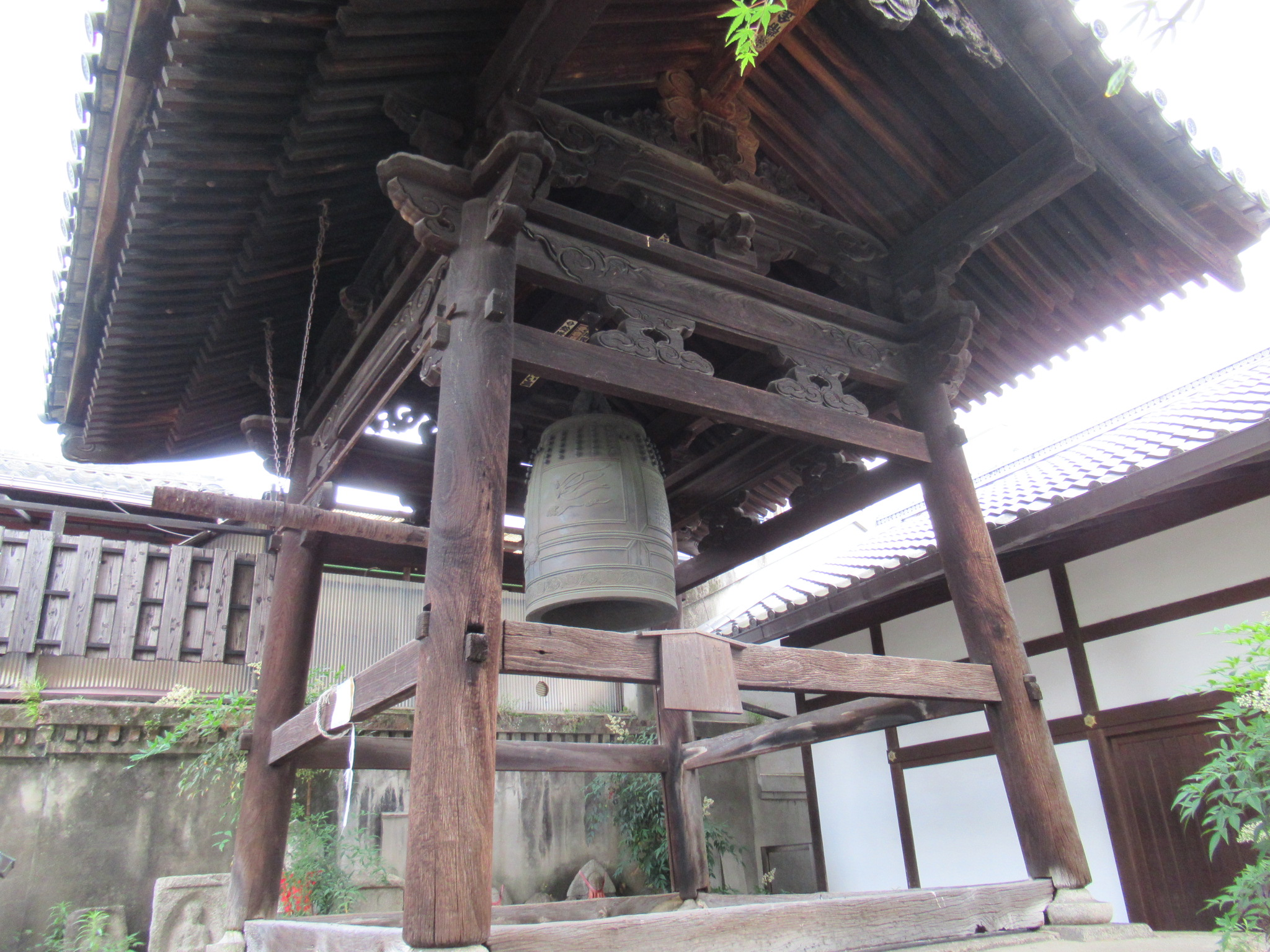
Shōrō

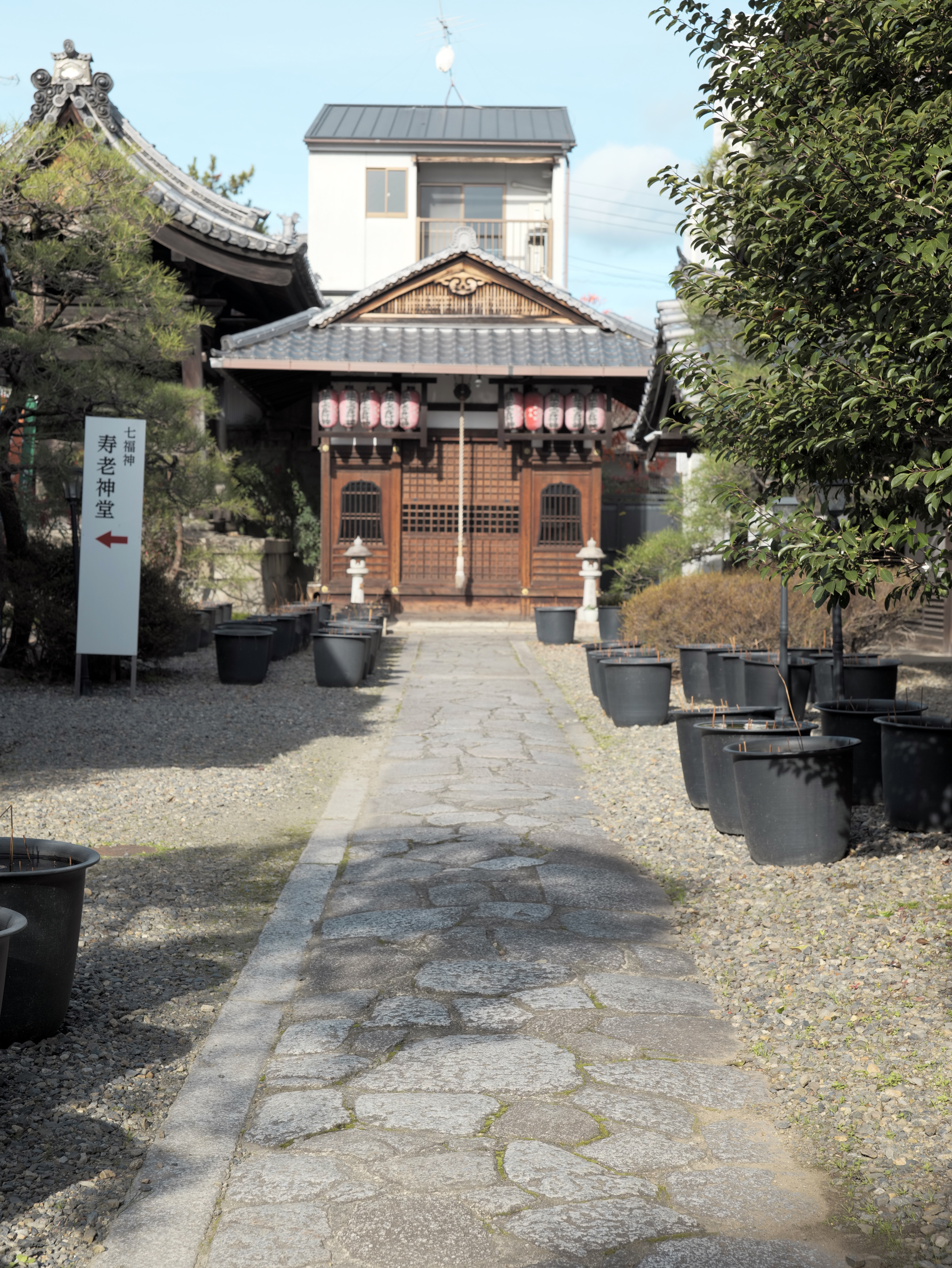
Chintaku-reifujin-dō

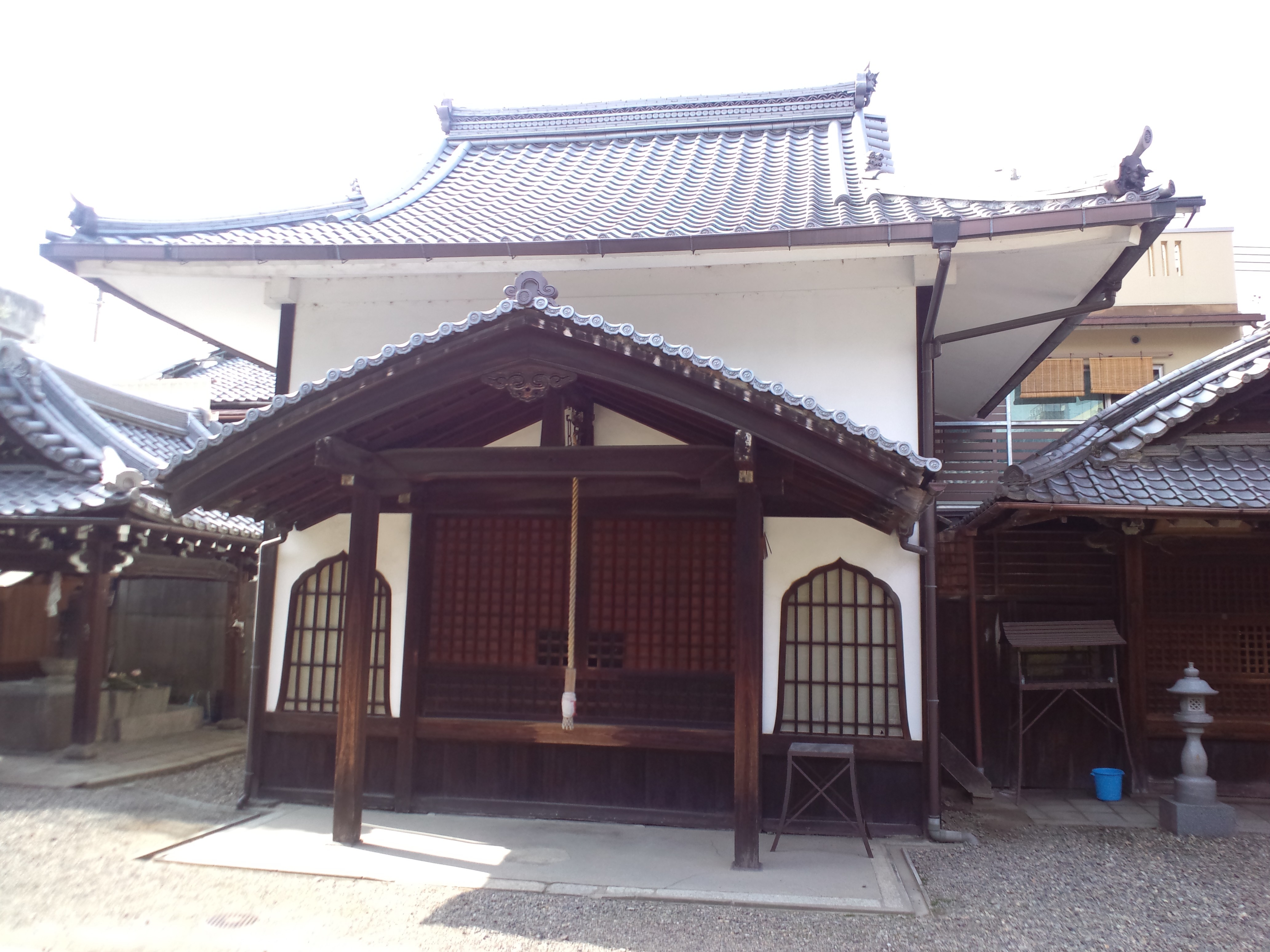
Aizen-dō

The temple is approximately a six-minute walk from Jingū-Marutamachi Station on the Keihan Ōtō Line or a seven-minute walk from Marutamachi Station on the Kyoto Municipal Subway Karasuma Line.

== Cultural Properties ==
=== Kyoto Prefecture Designated Tangible Cultural Property ===
- Hondō (本堂), Edo period;
- Shōrō (鐘楼), Edo period;
