= Banshū Kiyomizu-dera =

Buddhist temple in Katō, Hyōgo, Japan

Kiyomizu-dera (Banshū Kiyomizu-dera)
- 清水寺
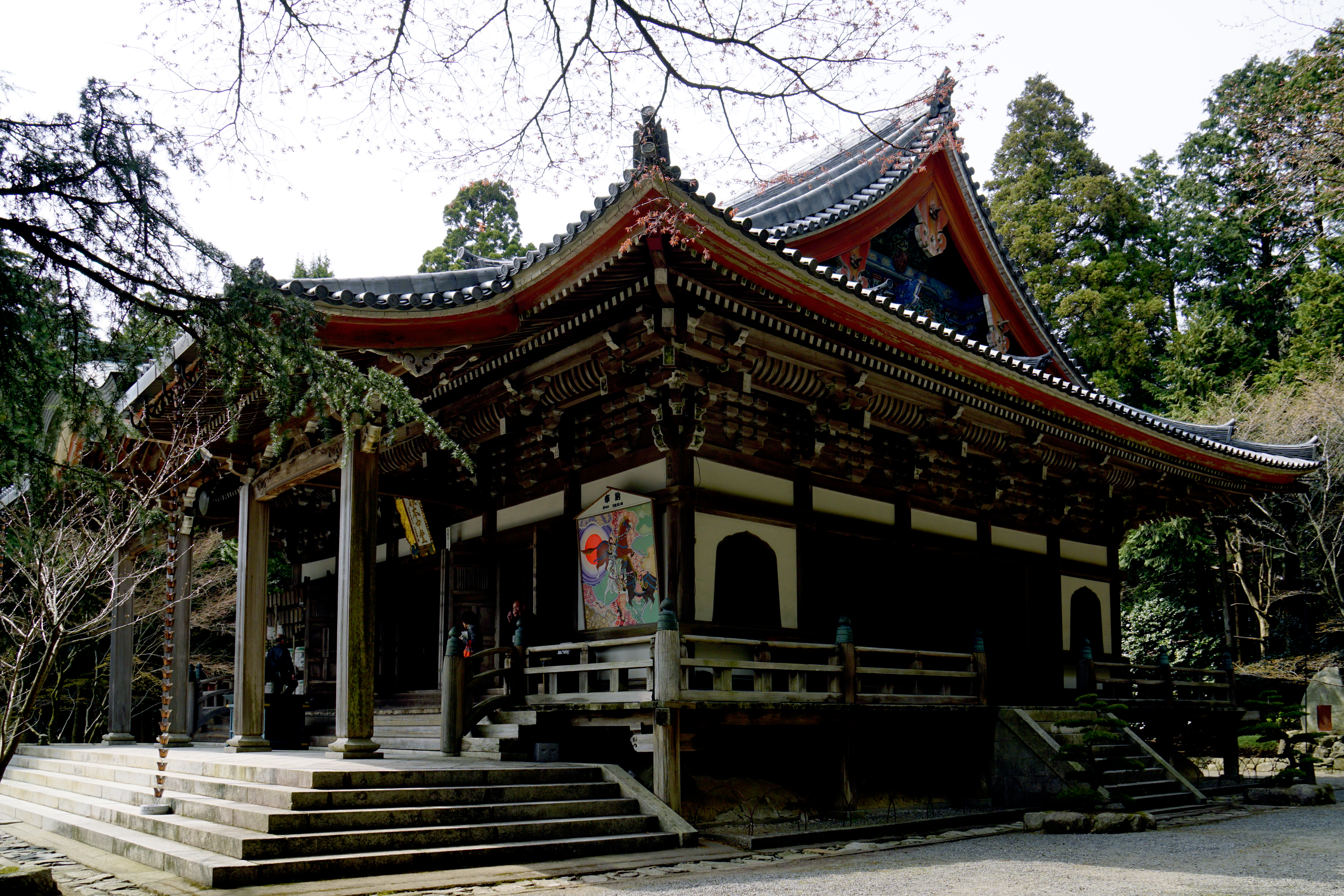
- Konponchu-do

- Location within Hyōgo Prefecture Location within Japan

Religion
- Affiliation: Buddhist
- Deity: Jūichimen Kannon
- Rite: Tendai
- Status: functional

Location
- Location: 1194 Hiraki, Katō-shi, Hyōgo-ken 673-1402
- Interactive map of Kiyomizu-dera (Banshū Kiyomizu-dera)
- Coordinates: 34°58′20.98″N 135°4′54.56″E

Architecture
- Founder: c. Hōdō
- Completed: c.Asuka period

Website
- Official website
- National Important Cultural Property

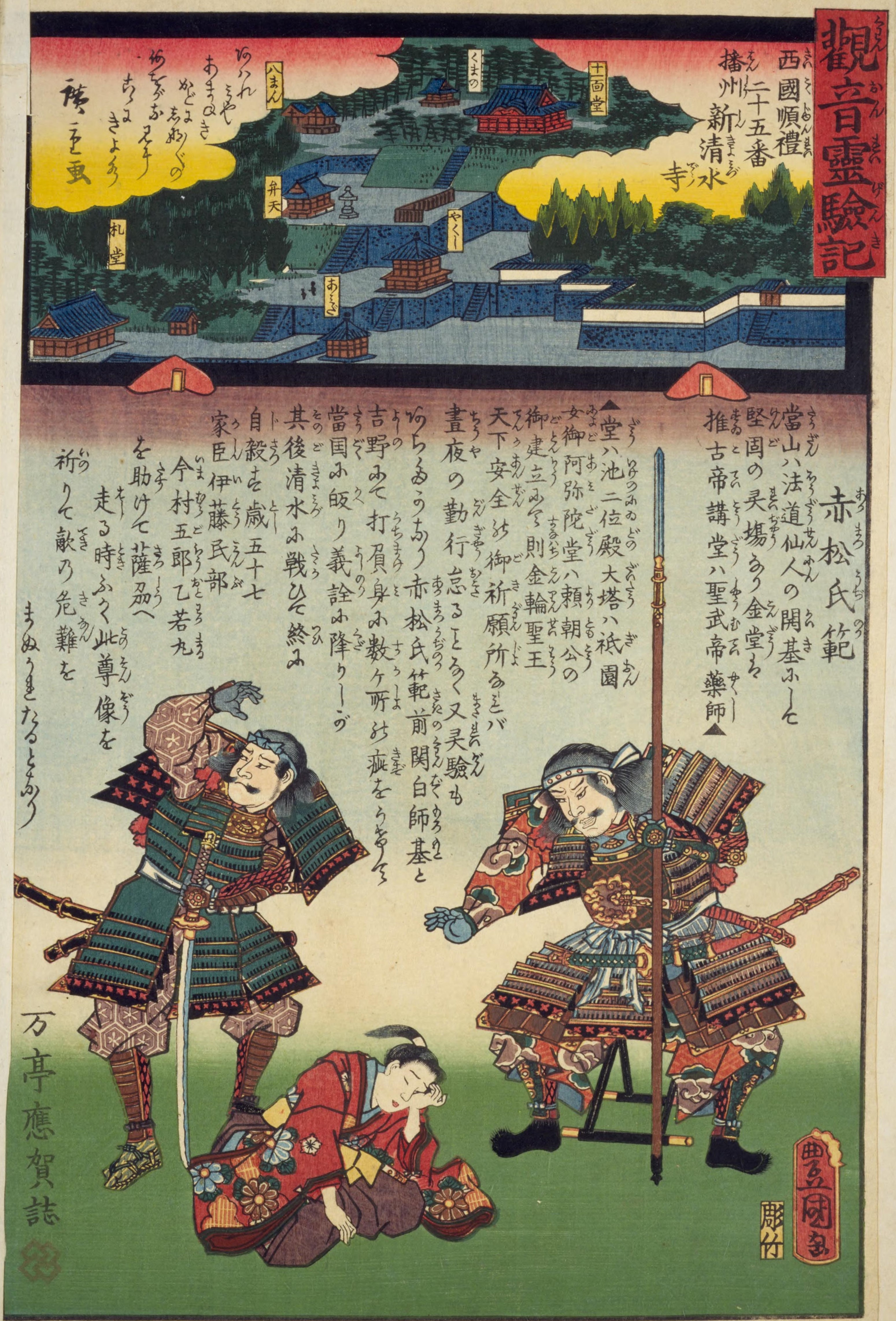
from the picture album "Kannon Reigen ki"

Kiyomizu-dera (清水寺) is a Buddhist temple located in the Hiraki neighborhood of the city of Katō, Hyōgo Prefecture Japan. It belongs to the Tendai sect of Japanese Buddhism and its honzon (primary image) is a hibutsu (secret/concealed image) statue of Jūichimen Kannon. The temple's full name is Mitake-san Kiyomizu-dera (御嶽山 清水寺). The temple is the 25th stop on the 33 temple Saigoku Kannon Pilgrimage route. It is often referred to as Banshū Kiyomizu-dera (播州清水寺) to disambiguate it from the more famous Kiyomizu-dera in Kyoto.

== History ==
Details surrounding the founding of this temple are uncertain. According to accounts such as the Kamakura period "Genkō Shakusho," the monk Hōdō flew to Japan on a purple cloud from India via Sui or Tang dynasty Chiba and Baekje (Korea). Hōdō discovered a sacred mountain in the shape of an eight-petaled lotus flower in Kamo County, Harima Province (present-day Kasai, Hyōgo). Upon landing there, he named it "Mount Hokke," referring to the sacred mountain of the Lotus Sutra. Hōdō was known as the "Empty Bowl Sennin" (Empty Bowl Sage) because he used his supernatural powers to send bowls flying out to receive offerings such as rice.

Temples with legends claiming to have been founded by the hermit Hōdō are concentrated in eastern Hyōgo Prefecture, and the possibility exists that there was a real person from India who inspired this legend and became a central figure in the local faith. However, there is no historical documentary evidence to support this theory.

The temple's legend claims that it was founded by Hōdō 1800 years ago (during the Kofun period). As the area suffered frequently from drought, Hōdō's prayed for water, and in repose to these prayers a sacred spring gushed forth. In gratitude, the temple was named "Kiyomizu-dera".

Although these stories are completely unsupported by any historical documentation or physical evidence, it is known that a Konponchudō Hall was built at the temple slightly later in 627 at the command of Empress Suiko. The Great Lecture Hall was then built by Gyōki at the request of Emperor Shōmu in 725.

The temple was destroyed and rebuilt repeatedly over its long history, and no historical documentation from these periods have been preserved. The current temple structures were rebuilt in 1917.

== Images of the temple ==
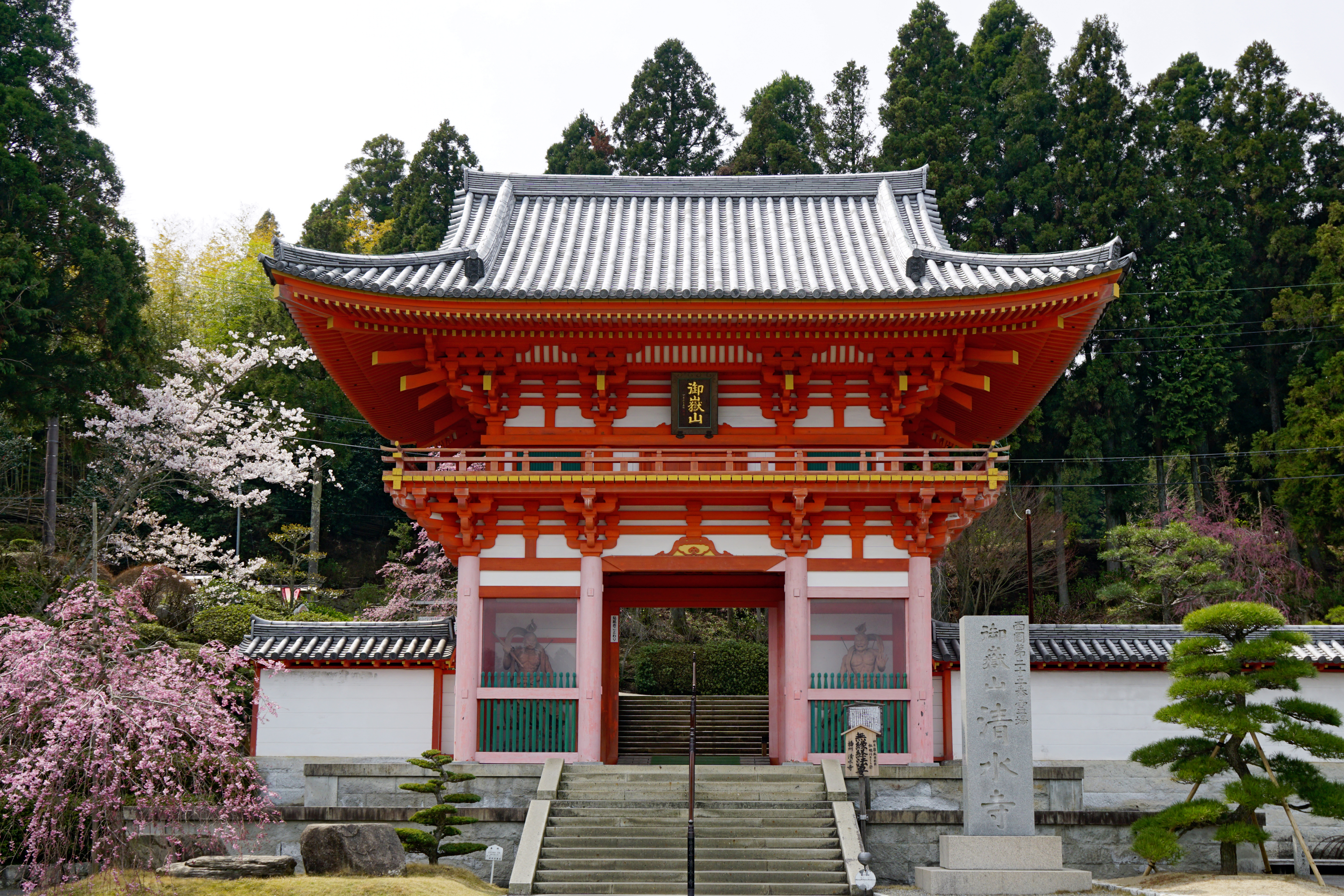
Niōmon

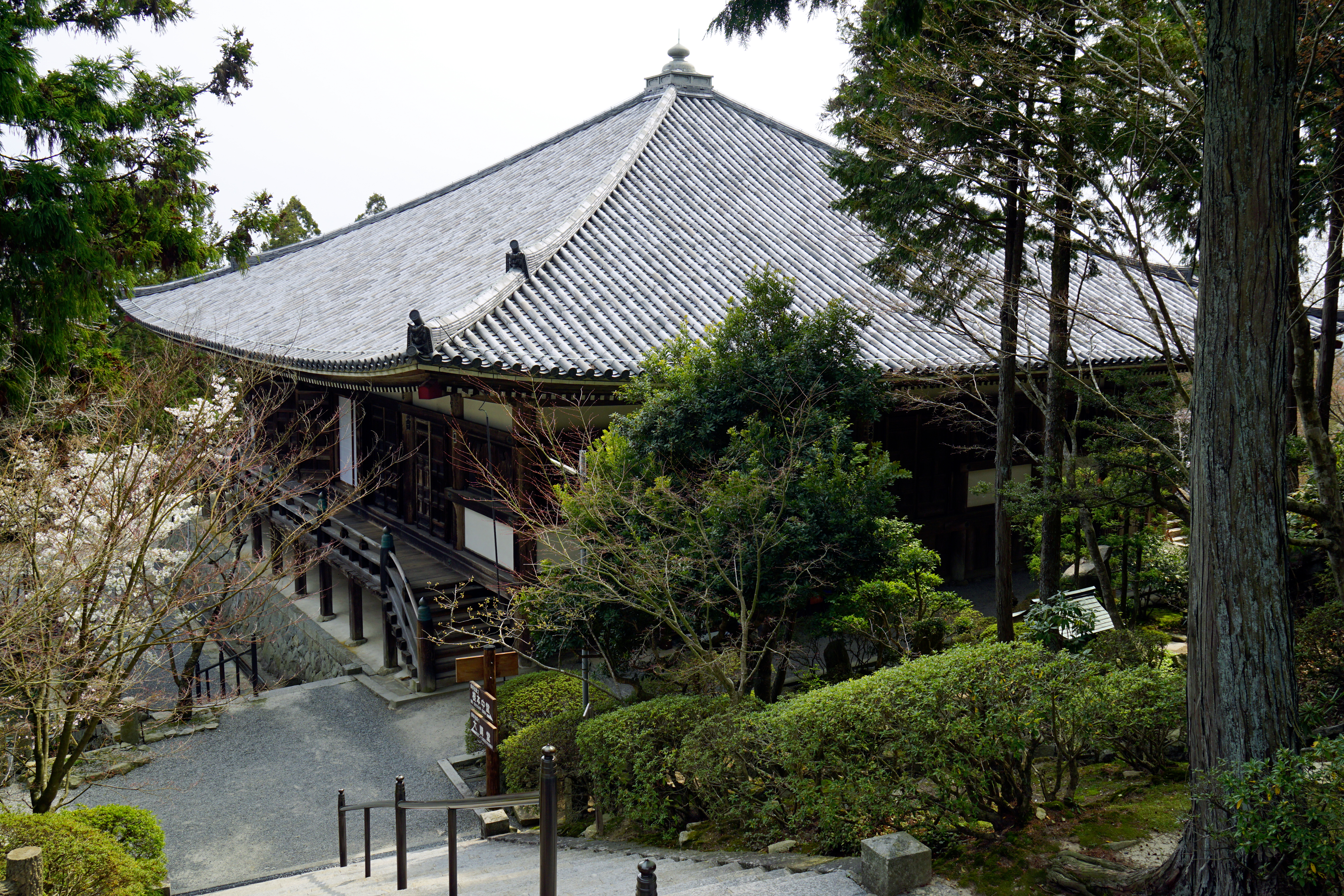
Kōdō

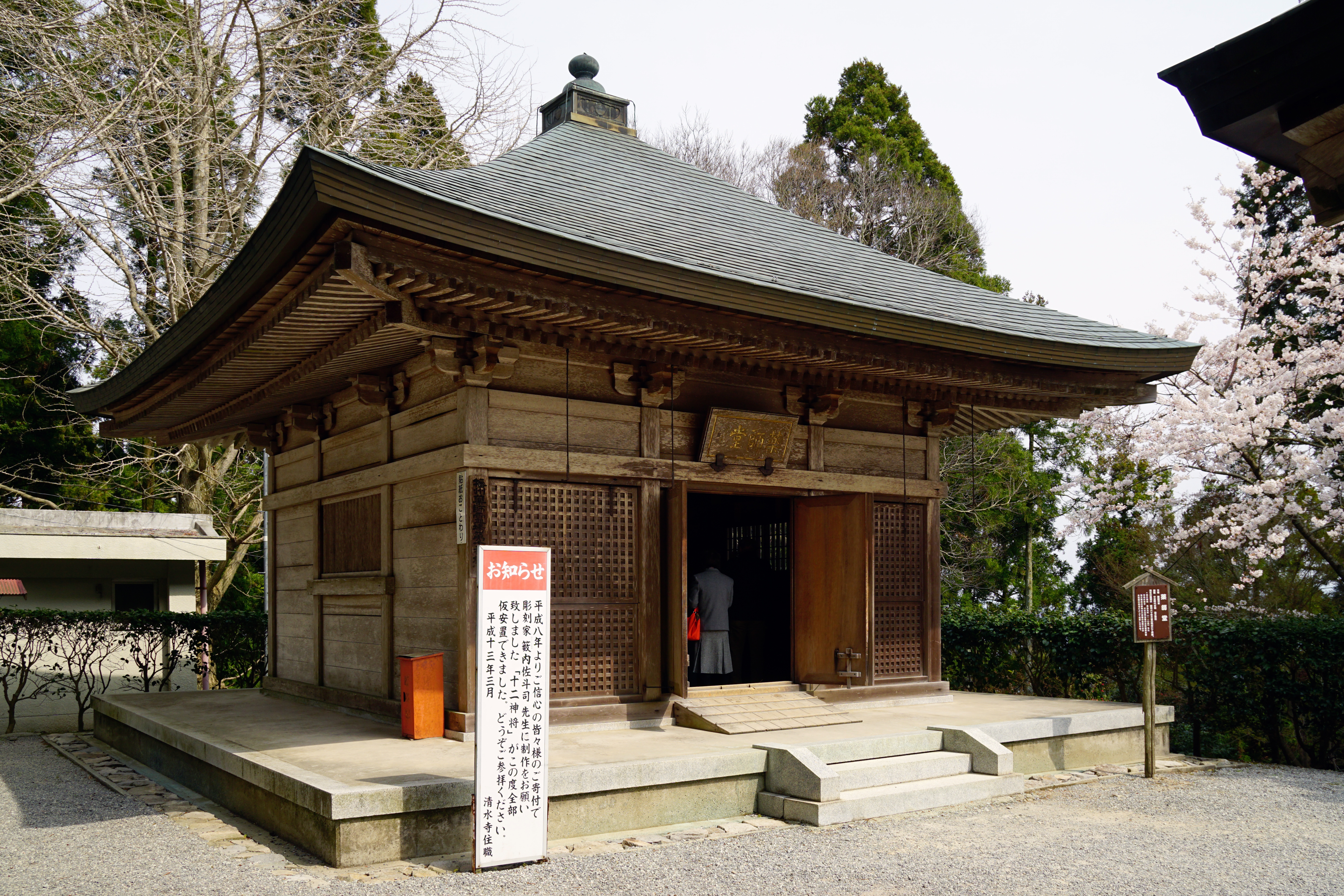
Yakushi-dō

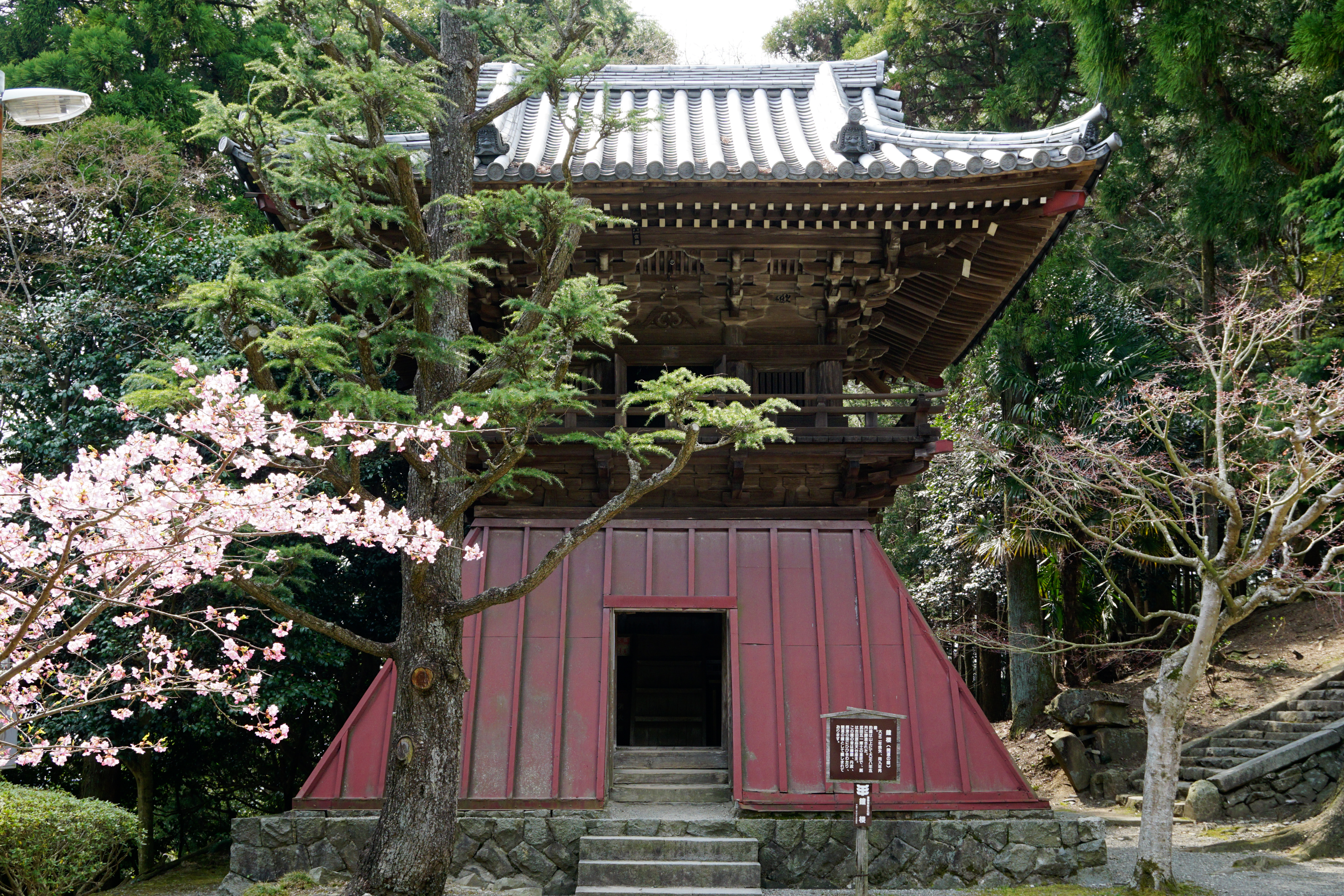
Shōrō

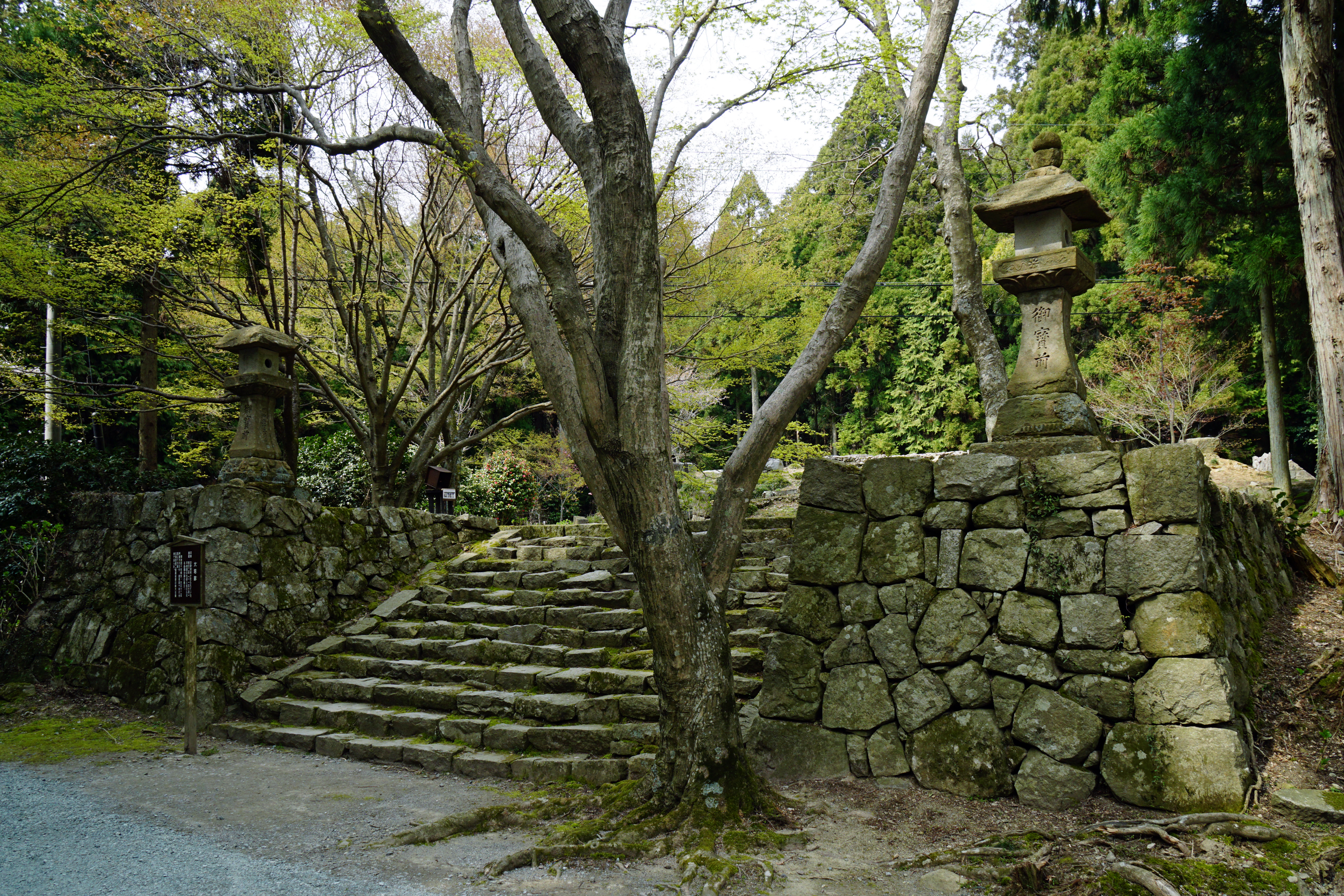
Site of the Tahōtō

== Access ==
The temple is approximately a 12.5 kilometers east of Aimoto Station on the JR West Fukuchiyama Line.

== Cultural Properties ==
=== National Important Cultural Properties ===
- Lotus Sutra, Volume 5, Large Characters (大字法華経巻第五), Nara period;
- Tachi with metal fittings (大刀 三口 附：拵金具十箇), Heian period (set of 3); claimed to be a donation from Sakanoue no Tamuramaro, now at Tokyo National Museum

=== National Registered Tangible Cultural Properties ===
- Konponchu-dō (根本中堂), Taishō period (1917)
- Dai-Kōdō (大講堂), Taishō period (1917)
- Shōrō (鐘楼), Taishō period (1919)
- Honbō (本坊), Taishō period (1917)
- Kyakuden (客殿), Taishō period (1917)

=== Hyōgo Prefecture Designated Tangible Cultural Properties ===
- Bronze statue of Bodhisattva (銅造菩薩立像), Asuka period
- Harima Kiyomizu-dera Documents (播磨清水寺文書), 41 scrolls, 608 items

=== Katō City Designated Tangible Cultural Properties ===
- Wooden standing statue of Jūchimen Kannon (木造十一面観音菩薩立像), mid-Heian period; made from a single piece of cypress wood, height 139.3 cm
- Wooden Standing Bishamon-ten Statue (木造毘沙門天立像), mid-Heian period; made from a single piece of Kaya wood, height 69.2 cm
- Wooden Standing Kisshōten Statue (木造吉祥天立像), late Muromachi period: made from cypress wood inlay, height 62.2 cm
- Wooden Standing Heavenly Being Statue (天部立像), 146.5-cm tall
- Kōsatsu and box (銅椀),
- Lotus Sutra in gold letters on dark blue paper, box (紺紙金字妙法蓮華経), 146.5-cm tall
- Kiyomizu-dera Zuiryū-in Old Chronicles (紺紙金字妙法蓮華経・経箱),
- Bronze Bowl (銅椀),
