= Siege of Ōta Castle =

- Part of the Sengoku period
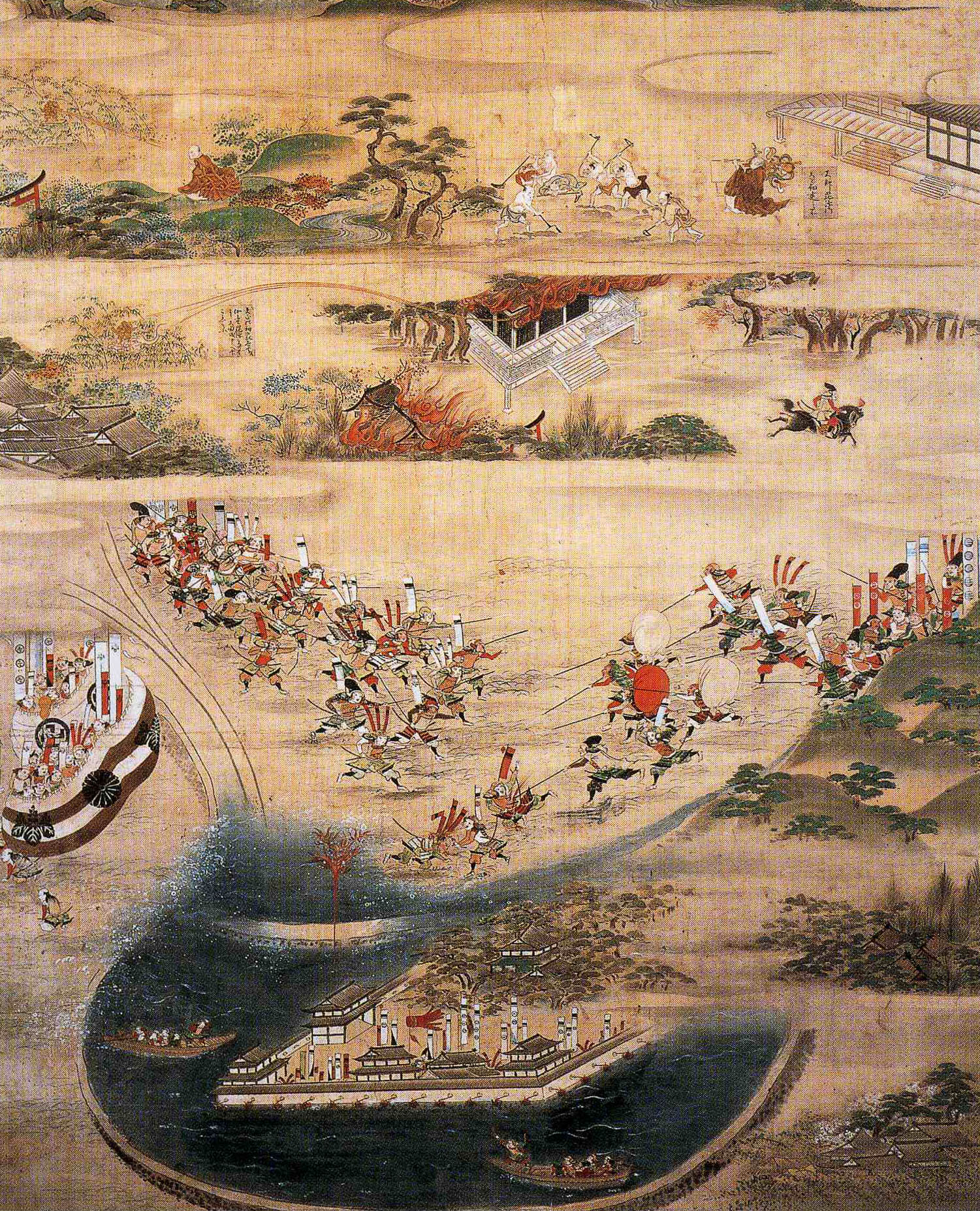
Date	1585
Location	Ōta Castle, Kii Province, Japan
Result	Siege succeeds; Toyotomi victory

Belligerents
Forces of Toyotomi Hideyoshi	Castle garrison Saiga Ikki

Commanders and leaders
Toyotomi Hideyoshi; Konishi Yukinaga	Ōta Munemasa

The 1585 siege of Ōta Castle (太田城の戦い, Ōta Jō no Tatakai) was one of a series of assaults made by Toyotomi Hideyoshi against the Ikkō-ikki religious zealots towards the end of Japan's Sengoku period. This battle followed the siege of Negoro-ji, in which Hideyoshi's forces burnt a temple complex to the ground; a number of the Saiga Ikki zealots escaped to nearby Ōta Castle, which was held by Ōta Munemasa.

Due to the topography of the area, Hideyoshi determined that he could not easily burn this fortress as he had the Negoro-ji; he decided to instead use flood tactics, as he had three years earlier in the siege of Takamatsu. The presence of the Ikki zealots was already straining Ōta's supplies of food and other resources even before the siege began. With the construction of a palisade and series of dikes roughly 300 meters from the castle, Hideyoshi began the process of isolating the castle from supplies, and flooding it, a process bolstered by heavy rains. At one point, part of the dike gave out, resulting in the drowning deaths of several of Hideyoshi's men. However, by the 22nd day of the fourth lunar month, the garrison could hold out no longer and surrendered; fifty samurai committed seppuku. As Hideyoshi took over the castle, he ordered all those from samurai families killed, while peasants were simply disarmed of all weapons, and sent back to their lords' fields.
