= Shingon-shū Buzan-ha =

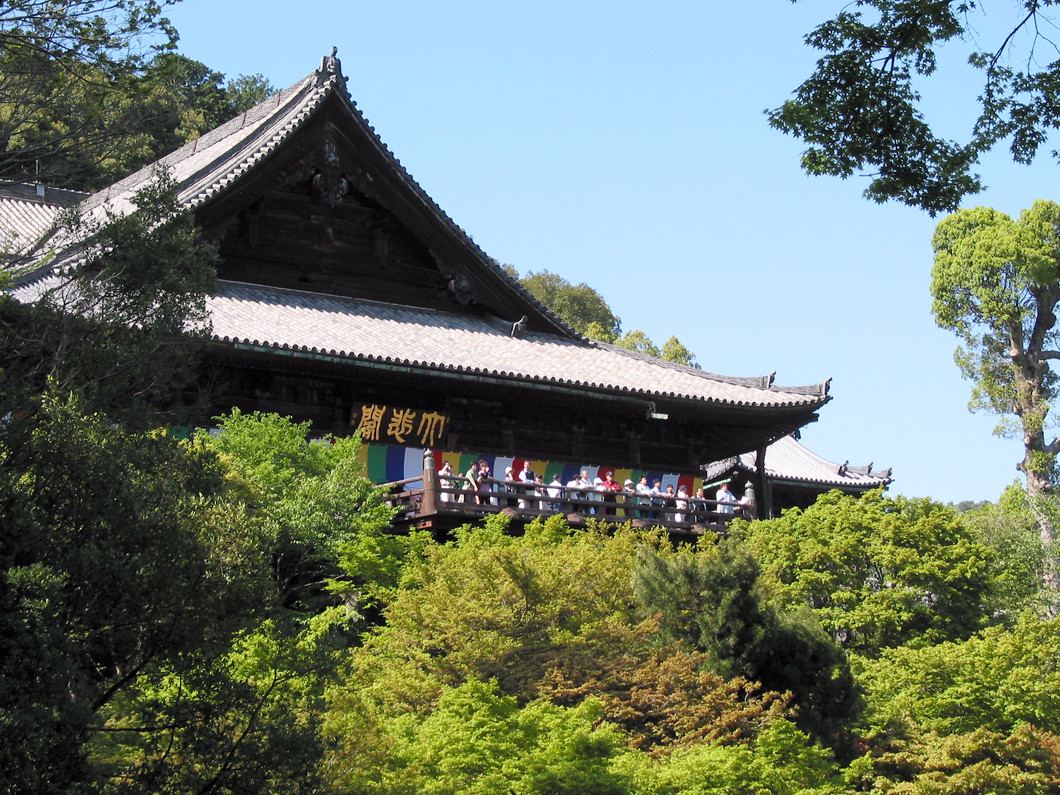
Hase-dera, main temple of the Buzan-ha sect.

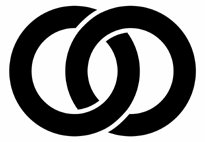
Shingon-shu Buzan-ha crest

Buzan-ha (真言宗豊山派, Shingon-shū Buzan-ha) is a sect of the new school of Shingon Buddhism (新義真言宗 Shingi Shingon-shū) founded in the 16th century by the priest Sen'yo Sōjō (専誉僧正)."Shingon Buddhism". Wikipedia. The main Buzan-ha temple is Hase-dera in Sakurai, Nara.

The reformed Shingon (shingi) faction was established by the priest Kakuban in the 12th century. After conflicts at Mount Kōya, Kakuban's group established Negoro-ji, where the Shingi Shingon tradition developed and later split into two main branches: Buzan-ha and Chisan-ha."Shingon Buddhism". Wikipedia. The Buzan-ha sect was strongly tied with the Tokugawa clan, receiving support from the shogunate. The temple Gokoku-ji in Tokyo became a focal point for spreading the Shingon teachings in the Kanto region. While gaining many followers in Kanto, historical circumstances led to limited presence in the Chūgoku and Kyushu regions due to the dispersal and consolidation of the Shingon sect.

== History ==
The history of the Buzan sect of Shingon begins with the establishment of Hase-dera. Although the founding of Hase-dera is estimated to be in the Nara period, the details remain unclear. According to temple records, in the first year of Shuchō (686), during the reign of Emperor Tenmu, Dokei erected a three-story pagoda on the western hill of Hatsuseyama. In the fourth year of Jinki (727), it is said that the monk Tokudo enshrined a statue of Ekādaśamukha (Juichimen-kannon) on the eastern hill (the current location of the main hall) and founded the temple, but this is considered within the realm of tradition.

In the 14th year of Jōwa (847) on December 21, Hase-dera was officially recognized as a fixed-amount temple, and on May 10, in the 2nd year of Ten'an (858), it was recorded that the three precepts were established. It is believed that during this period, Hase-dera was recognized as an official temple, and an administrator was appointed.

From the mid-Heian period onward, Hase-dera attracted the faith of the aristocracy as a Kannon pilgrimage site. In the first year of Manju (1024), Fujiwara no Michinaga made a pilgrimage, and from the medieval period onwards, it spread its influence to warriors and commoners.

Although originally a sub-temple of Tōdai-ji, during the mid-Heian period, it became a sub-temple of Kōfuku-ji. In the 16th century, it followed the lineage of the Shingi Shingon school. In 1585, Toyotomi Hideyoshi attacked Negoro-ji, forcing followers of the reformed Shingon school to flee."Shingon Buddhism - Sengoku period". Wikipedia. "Mount Negoro, the center of Shingi Shingon, was sacked by the daimyō Toyotomi Hideyoshi in 1585." In the 16th year of Tenshō (1588), these displaced monks settled at Hase-dera. Under the leadership of the sect's monk Sen'yo, the Buzan sect was officially formed."Shingon Buddhism - Edo period". Wikipedia. "During the Edo period (1603–1868), the Shingi Shingon monks from Mount Negoro had escaped and took their lineages elsewhere, eventually founding new schools at Hase-dera (the Buzan school) and at Chishaku (the Chisan-ha school)."

Due to the Meiji government's religious policies, it merged with other Shingon sects in 1879. However, in September 1900, it regained independence as the Buzan sect of Shingon Buddhism, with Hase-dera as its head temple.

== Branches ==
In March 1941, various Shingon sects, including the old and new Shingi Shingon sects, merged to form the Dai-Shingon sect under government policy."Shingon Buddhism - 20th century". Wikipedia. "In March 1941, under the government's religious policy, Shingon schools were forcibly merged to form the 'Dai-Shingon' sect." However, after the war, it regained independence and was officially registered as Shingon-shū Buzan-ha in 1952.

Today the Buzan-ha sect has 3,000 temples, 5,000 priests and two million followers. Its largest chapters outside Japan are located in Hong Kong (under the name "Mantra School for Lay Buddhists") and Vietnam (under the name "Minh Nguyệt Cư Sĩ Lâm").

== See also ==
- Chisan-ha
- Shingi Shingon
- Kakuban
