= Hase-dera =

Buddhist temple in Nara, Sakurai, Japan

Coordinates: 34°32′09″N 135°54′25″E

Buzan Shinrakuin Hase-dera
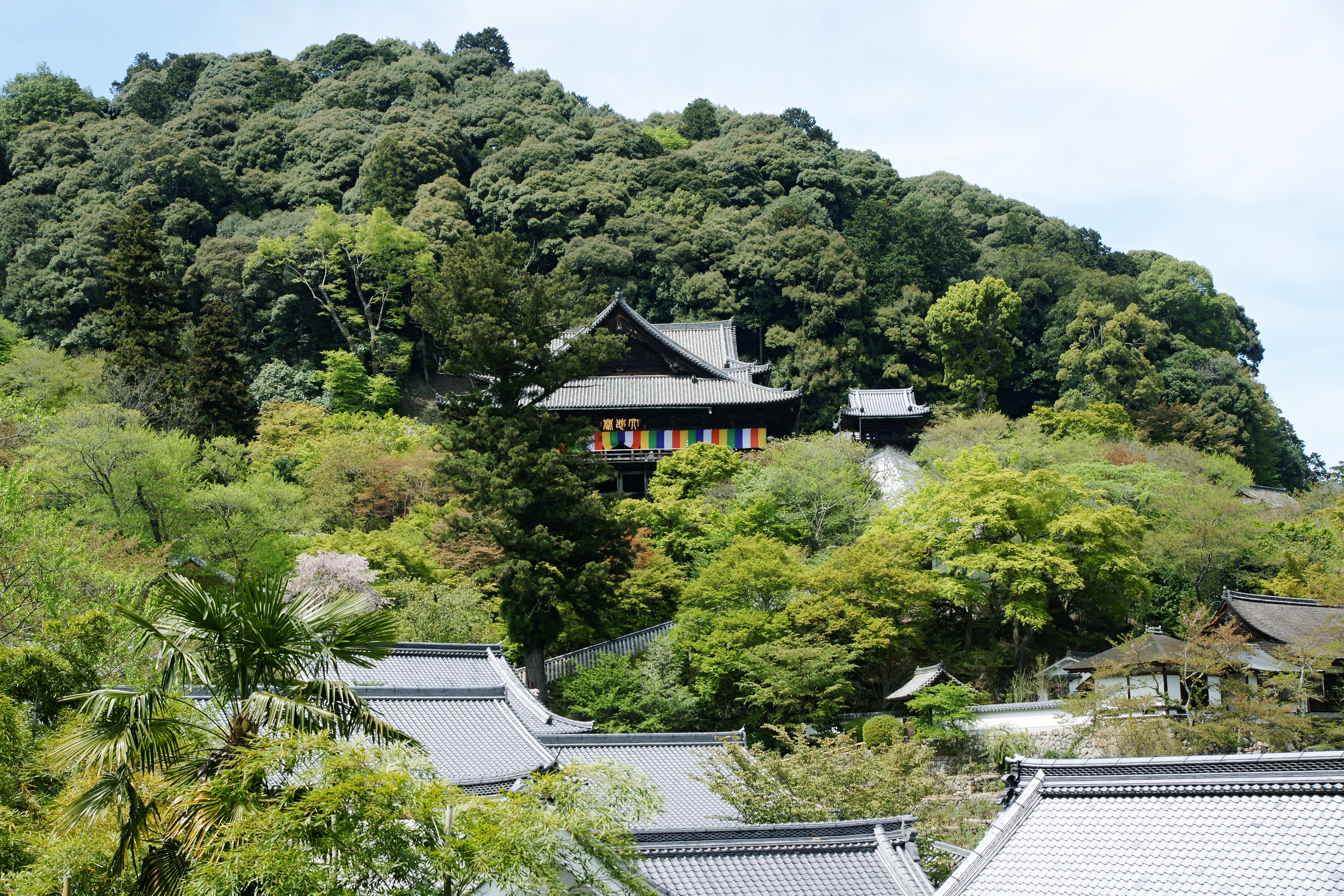

Religion
- Affiliation: Shingon-shu Buzan-ha

Location
- Location: 731-1 Hatsuse, Sakurai, Nara Prefecture
- Country: Japan
- Interactive map of Buzan Shinrakuin Hase-dera

Architecture
- Completed: 8th century (727?)

Website
- http://www.hasedera.or.jp/index.html

Hase-dera (長谷寺) is the main temple of the Buzan sect of Shingon Buddhism. The temple is located in Sakurai, Nara Prefecture, Japan. The Main Hall is a National Treasure of Japan.

== Overview ==
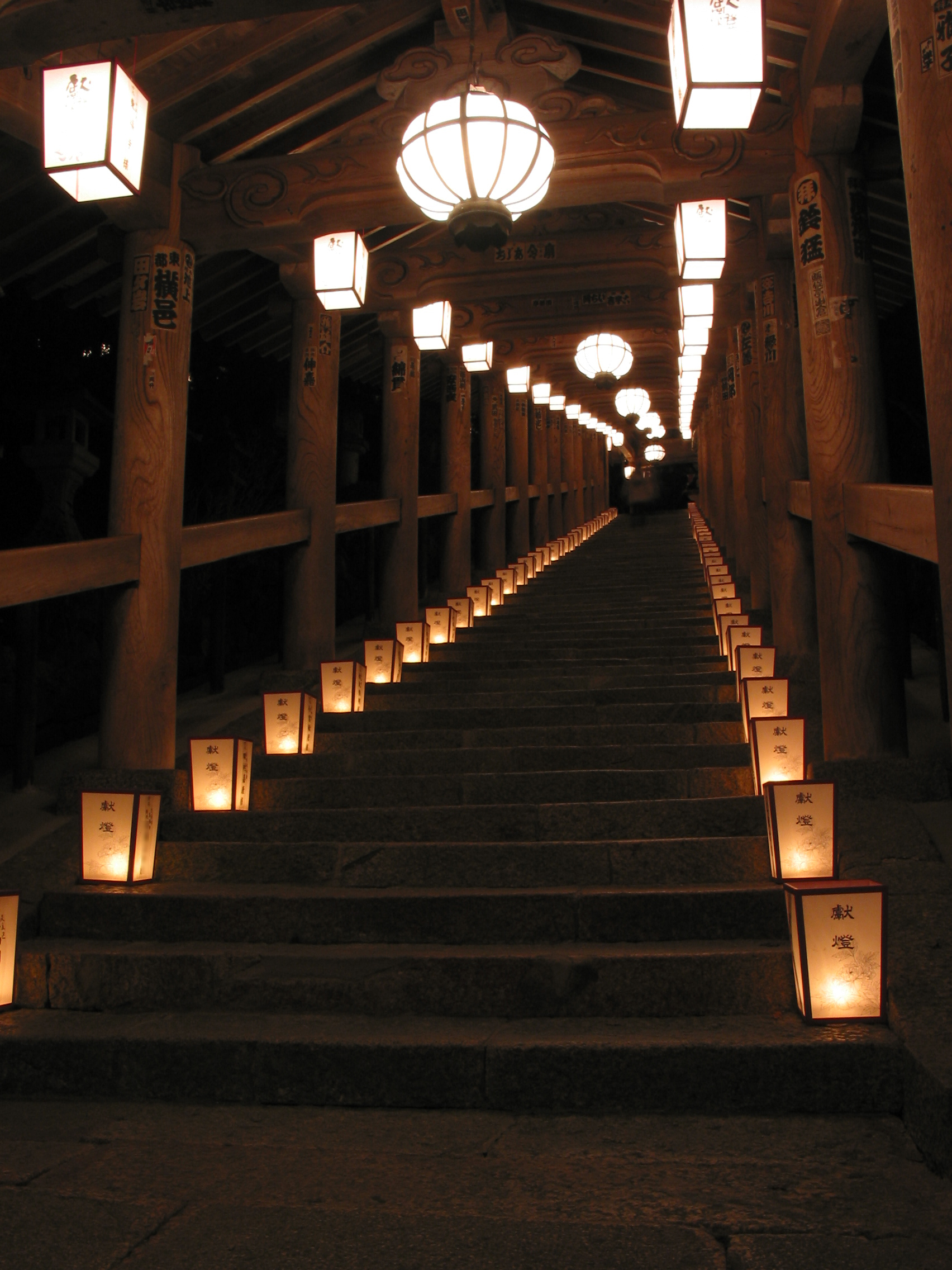
The staircase

According to the description on the bronze plaque known as the Hokke Sessō-zu (銅板法華説相図, dōban hokke sessō zu), which is enshrined at Hase-dera, the temple was first built in 686 and dedicated to Emperor Tenmu, who was suffering from a disease. Later, in the year 727, the temple was expanded by order of Emperor Shōmu and a statue of Jūichimen Kannon, an eleven-headed manifestation of the Bodhisattva Kannon, was placed near the original temple that enshrined the bronze plaque. The temple has been burned down and rebuilt as many as ten times since the 10th century.

During the Heian period the temple was favored by members of the nobility, such as the authors of the Kagerō Nikki and the Sarashina Nikki. Hase-dera was consistently popular with visitors, helped by the fact it was situated on what was then the route to the Ise Shrine. Later still, Hase-dera flourished as one of the centers of the reformed Shingon Buddhism, particularly after the arrival of priest Sen'yo from Negoro-ji in 1588.

The current Main Hall is a reconstruction of 1650 built using donations from Tokugawa Iemitsu. A covered wooden staircase (登廊, noborirō), 200 metres long, leads to the Hall from the Niō Gate. The hall is perched on the cliffside, supported by large stilts using the kakezukuri technique.

The temple is especially popular in the spring, when the 700 Chinese peonies that line the staircase are in bloom, and in the fall, when the leaves of the many maple trees in the temple grounds have turned red.

== Treasures ==
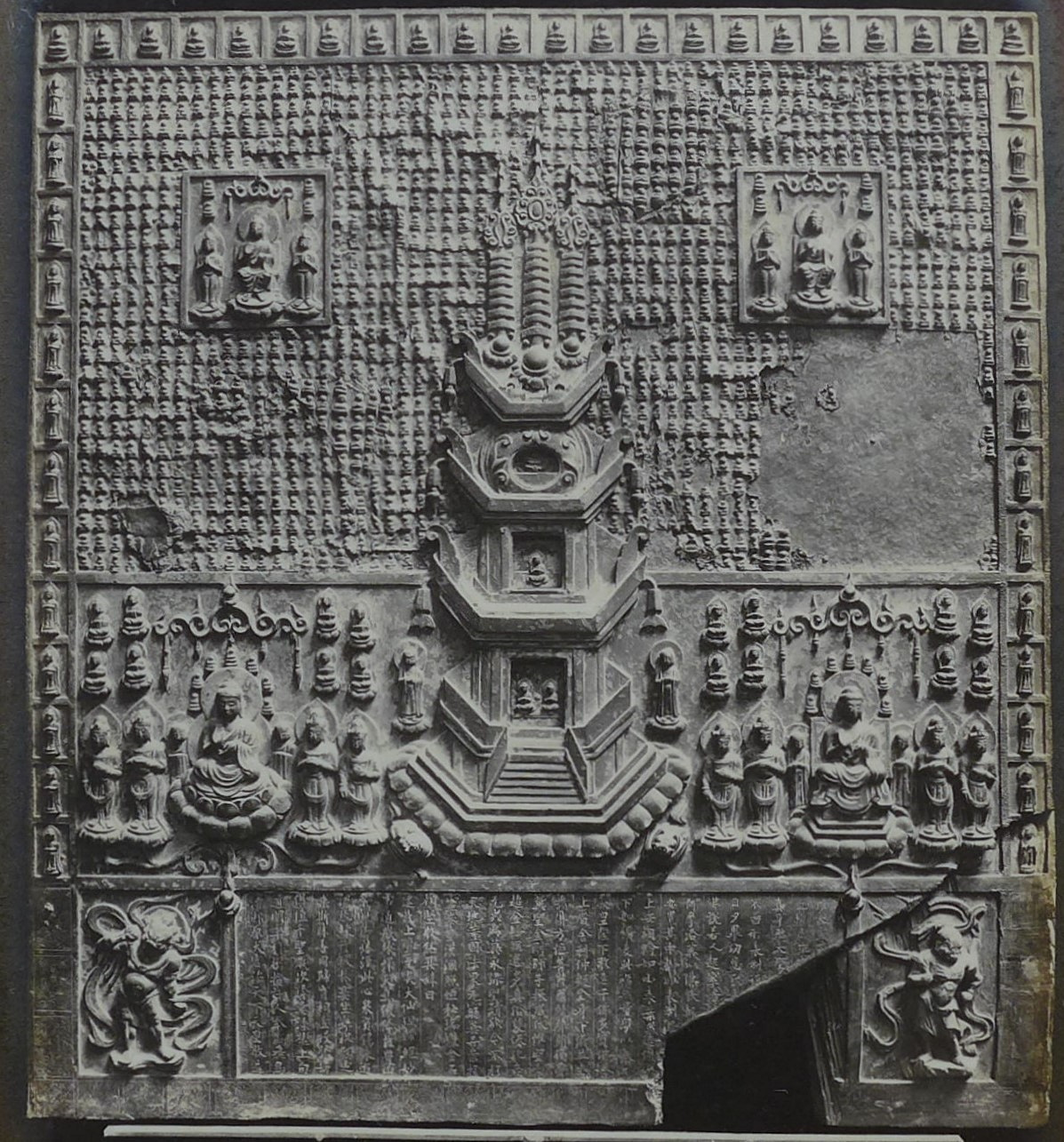
Hokke Sesso Bronze Plaque

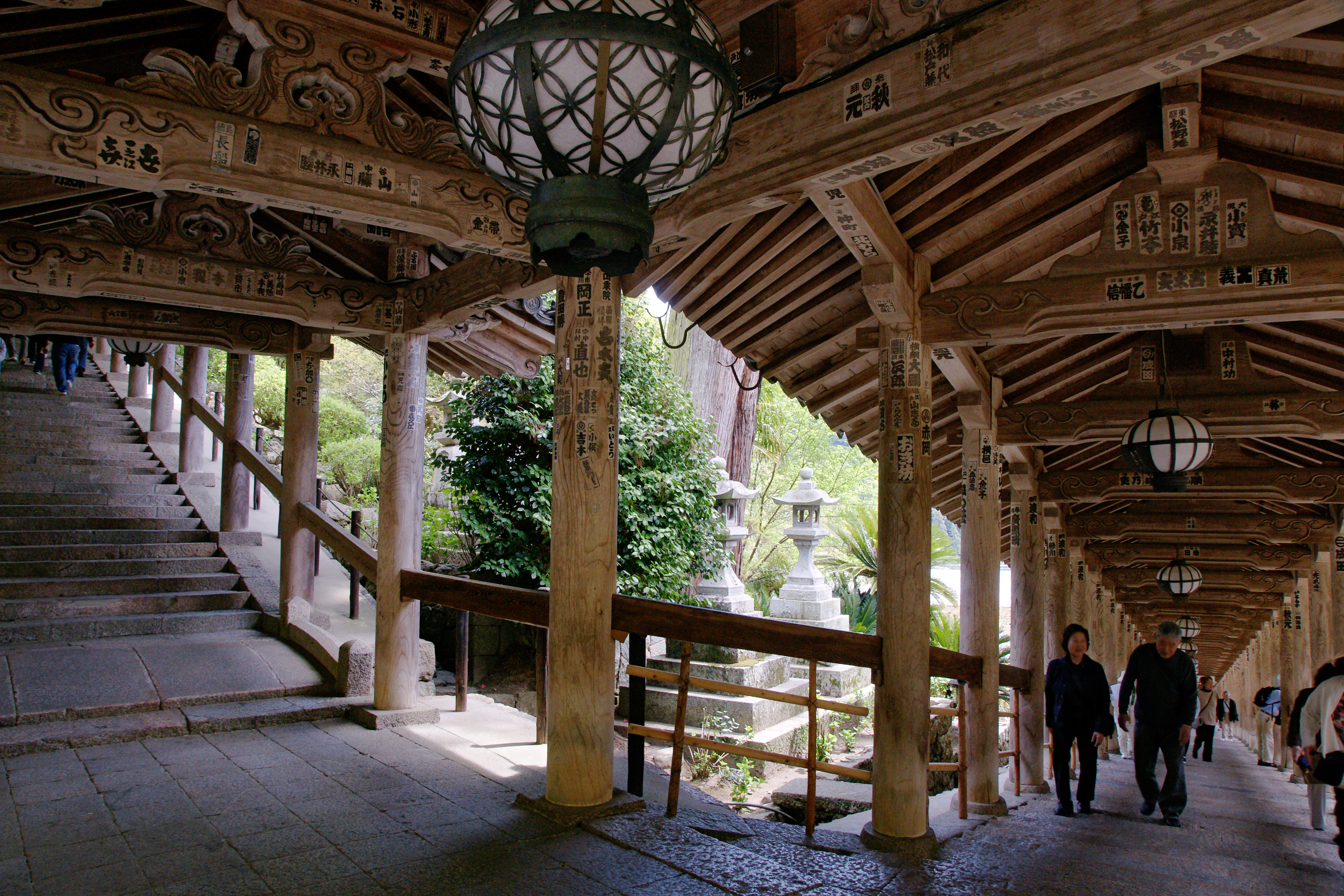
The Staircase

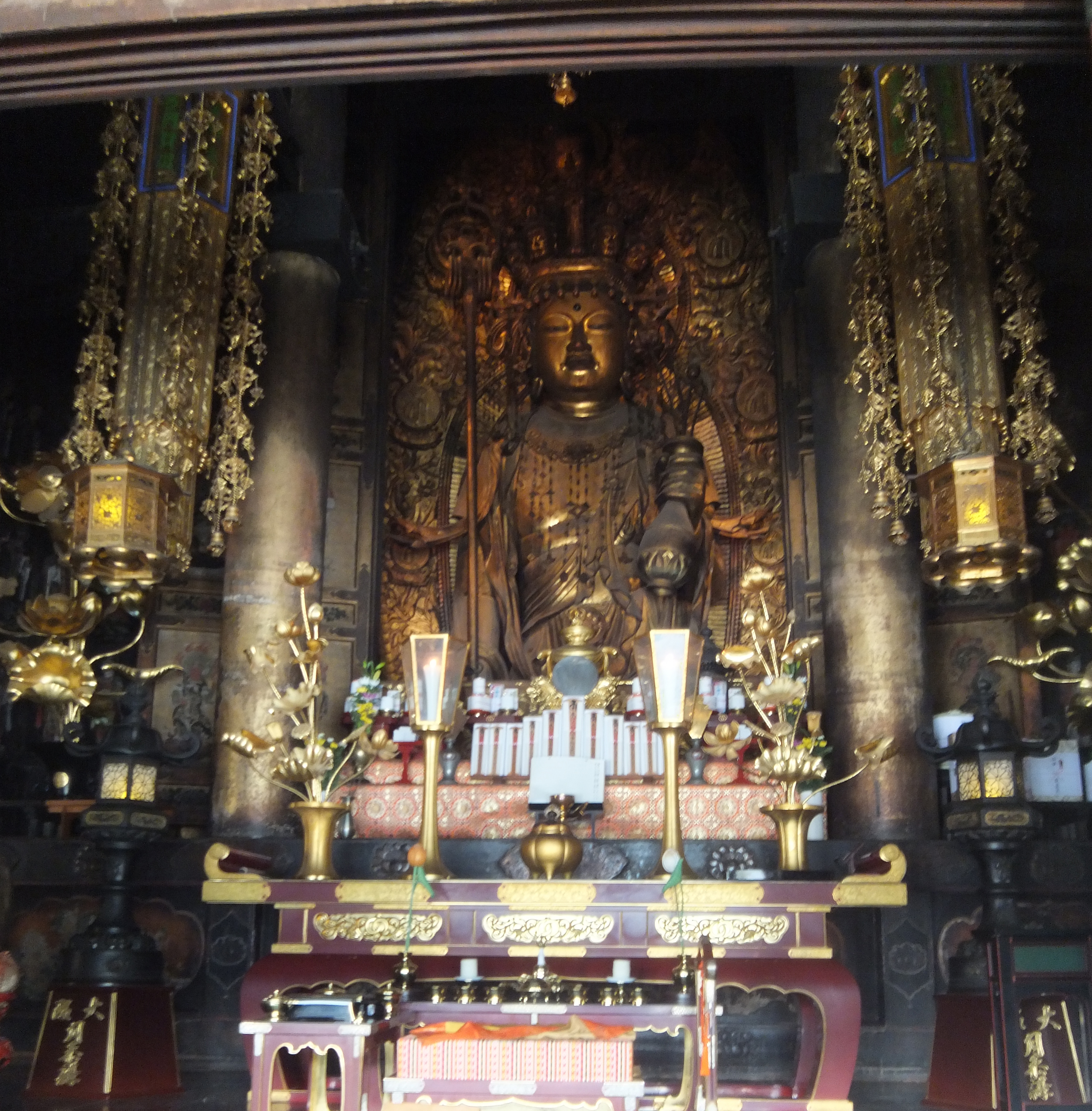
Jūichimen Kannon

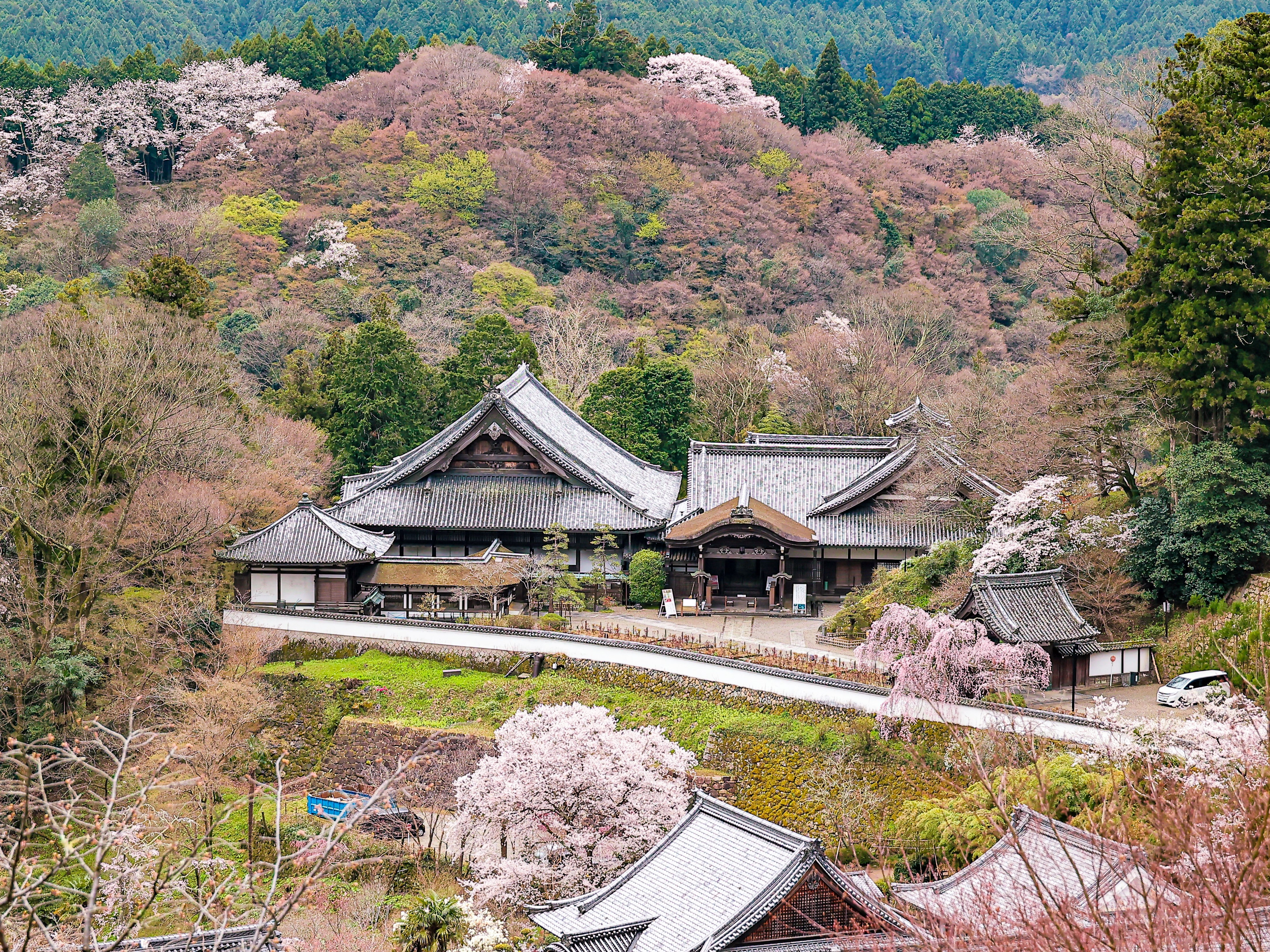
Office of Hase-dera in spring

The designated Important Cultural Properties at Hase-dera include:

- The Main Hall (National Treasure): The Main Hall at Hase-dera is one of the largest halls in the Nara prefecture; the statue of the Eleven Faced Kannon is located in this hall.
- The bronze plaque of the Hokke Sessō-zu (National Treasure): This plaque measures 75 cm (width) by 84 cm (height) and features at its center a hexagonal three story pagoda, surrounded by a series of panels showing two Buddhas sitting on lotus seats, as well as various deities and monks. The lower panel features 27 lines of inscription that is boarded by two guardian gods.
- A copy of the Lotus Sutra. (National Treasure)
- The Niōmon (Important Cultural Property): The Niō are present at the gates of many Japanese Buddhist temples, one on each side of the entrance. These statues are protectors of the temple, and can be thought of as two benevolent kings. These statues lend their name to the gate of the temple, which has become known as the Nio Gate (niōmon). The Nio have a threatening appearance in order to discourage demons and thieves.
- The Staircase (Important Cultural Property): The staircase is made up of 399 small stone steps, and is around 200 meters long. Pilgrims who visit the temple believe that when walking the staircase, it help to get rid of the 108 illusions that they believe lead to all human suffering.
- The Eleven-faced Kannon (Important Cultural Property): The Statue of the Eleven Faced Kannon (the Goddess of Mercy) is 9.3 meters (or 31 feet) tall and it is said that it was carved by a priest known as Tokodo.This is said to be the largest wooden statue in Japan. Its faces consist of one primary face and ten secondary faces that are said to allow Kannon to see all around, in case anyone is in need of her assistance.
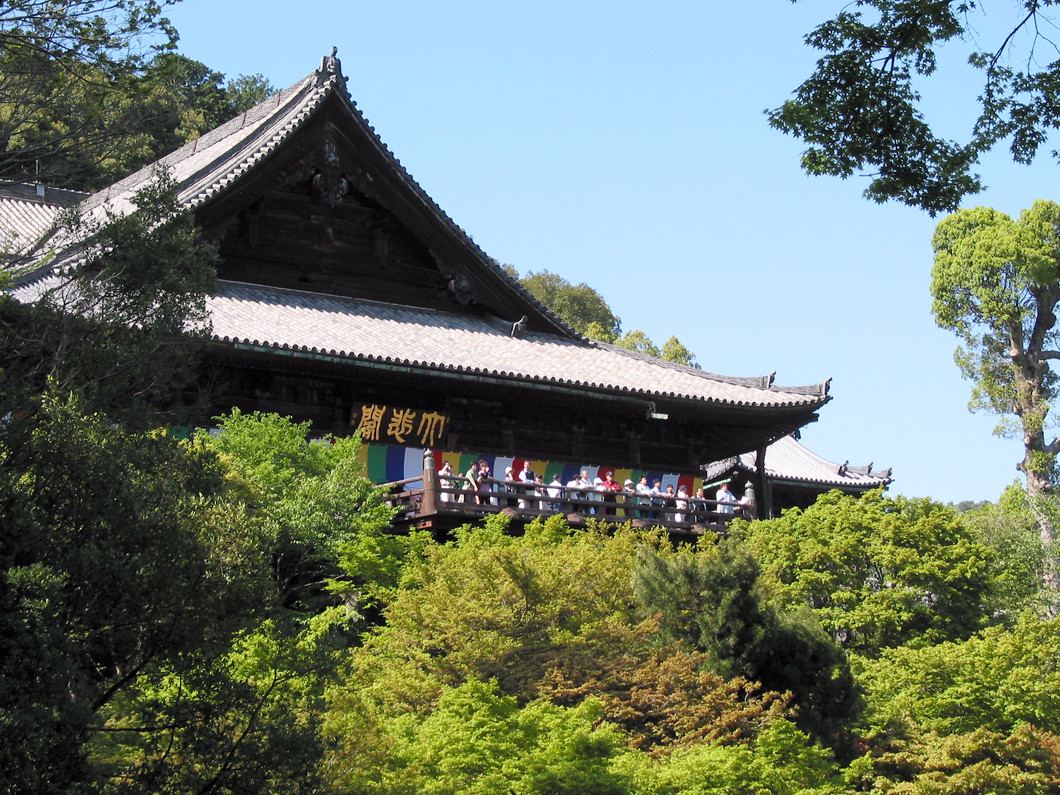
The Main Hall

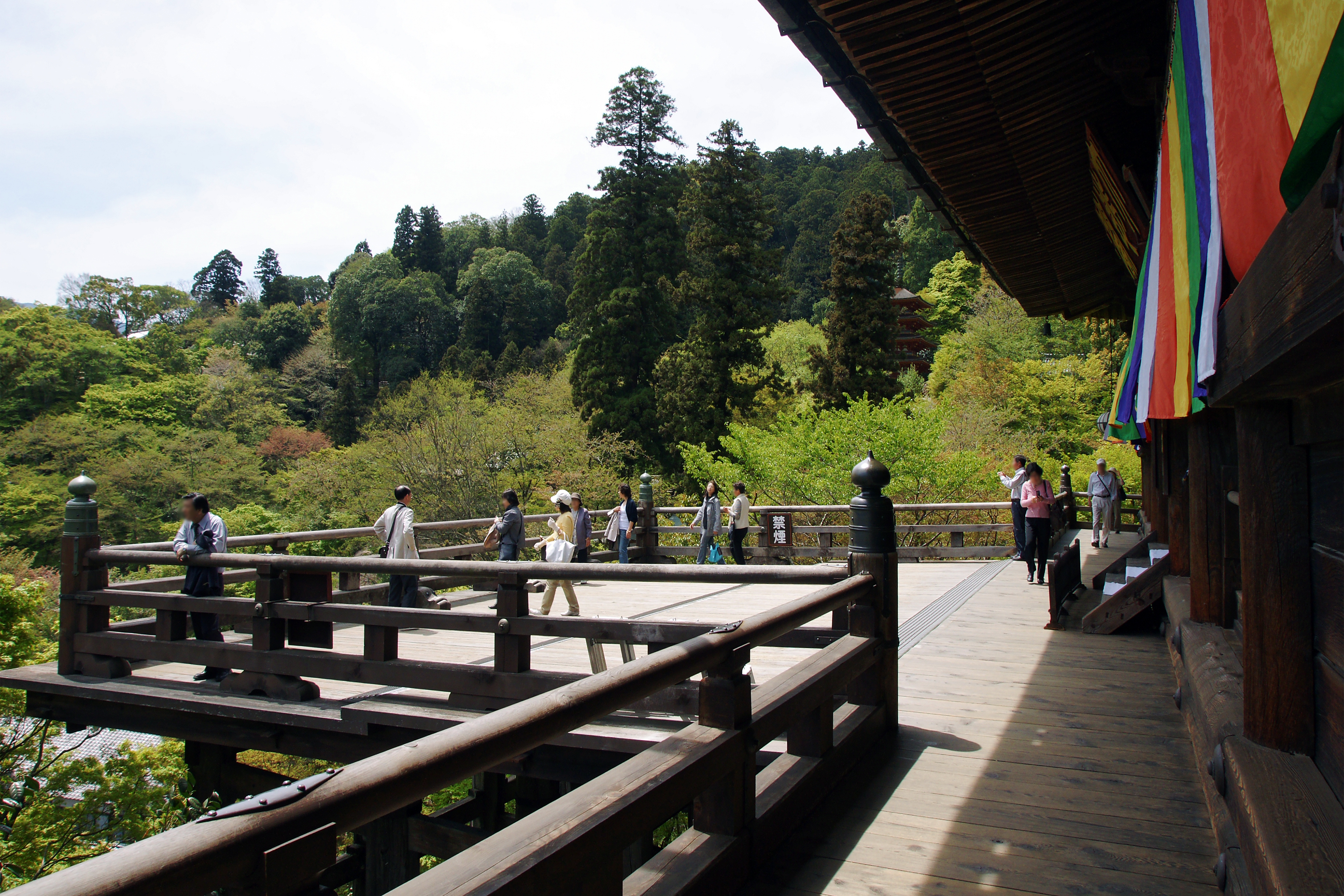
The Main Hall

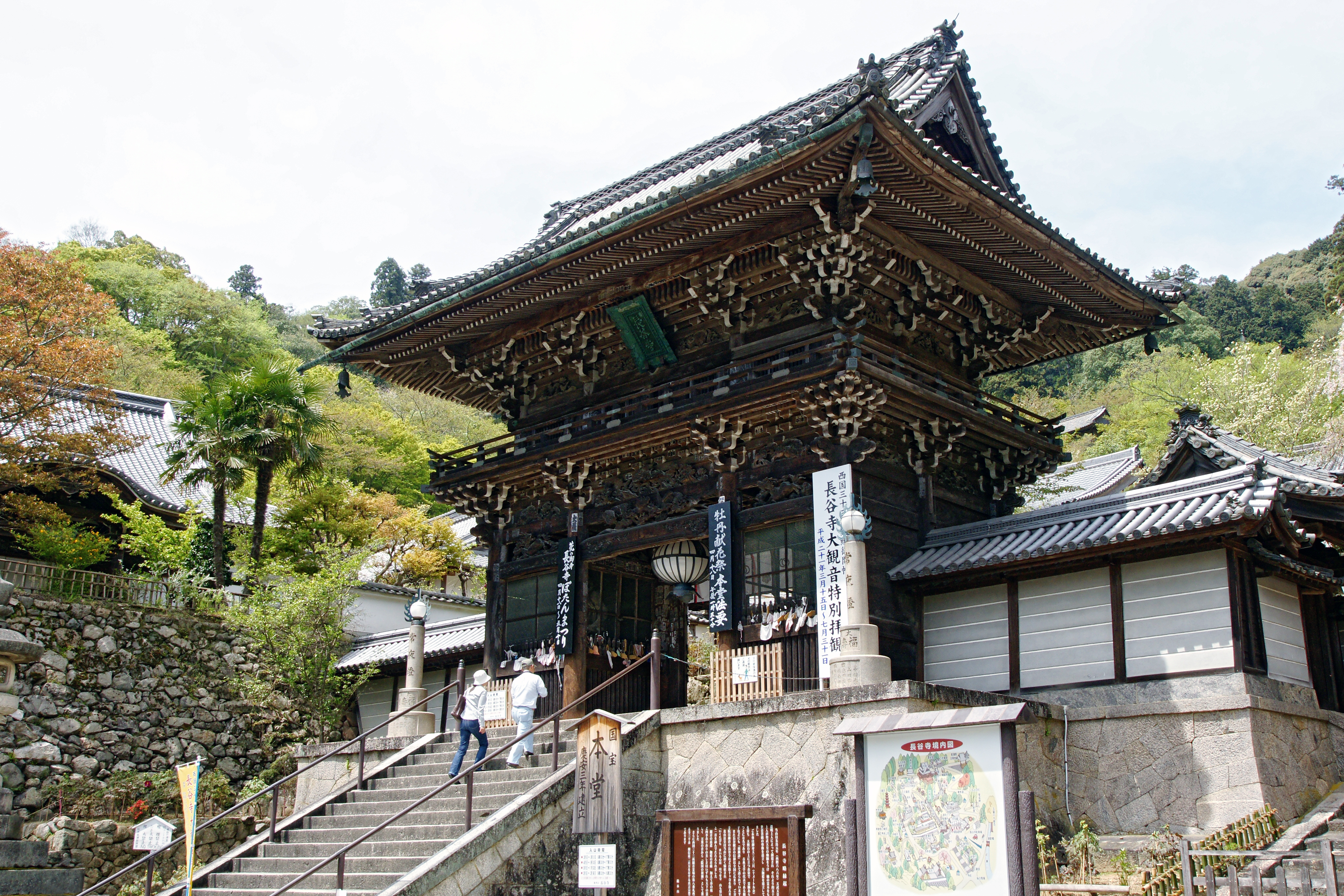
The Niō gate

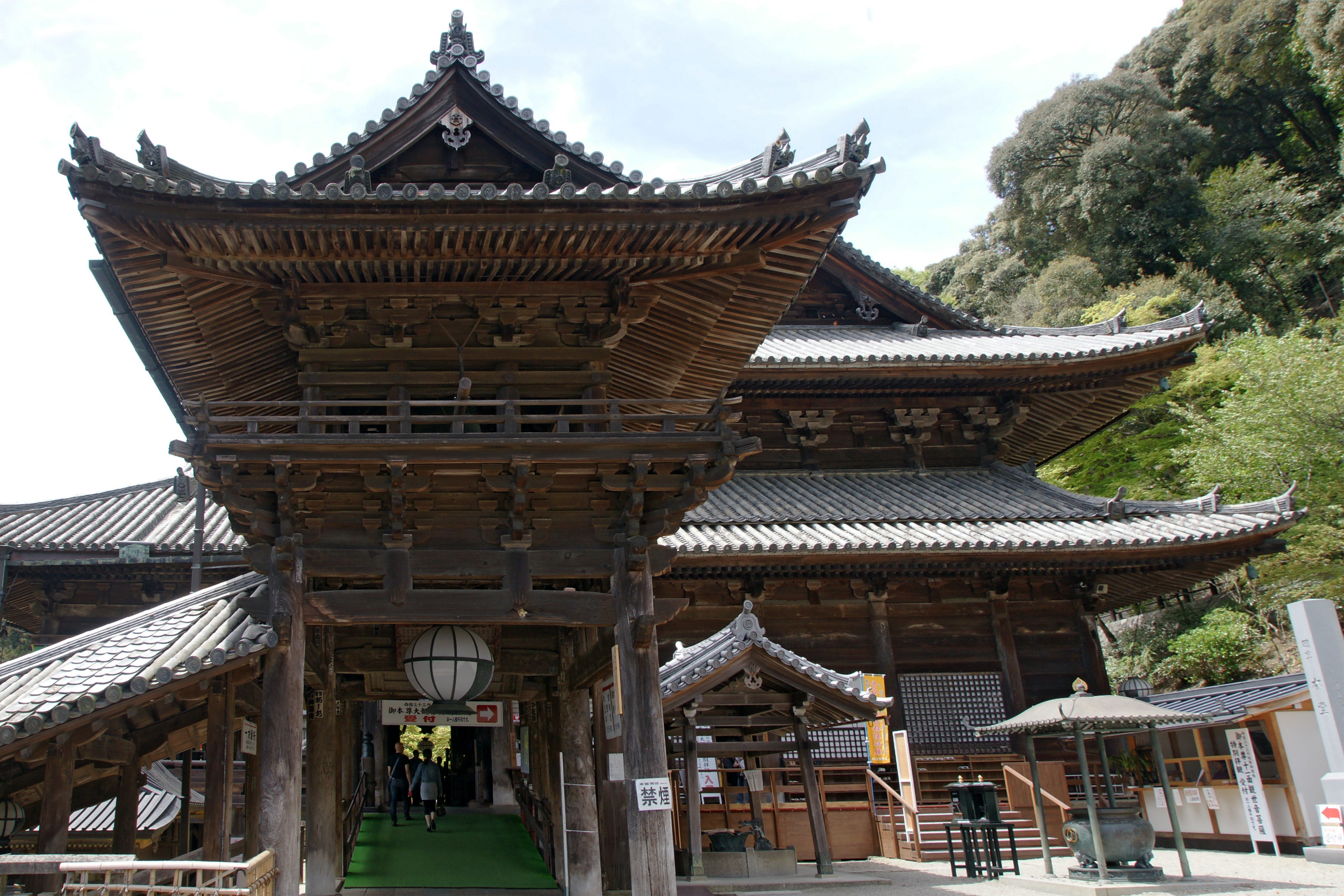
The Bell tower

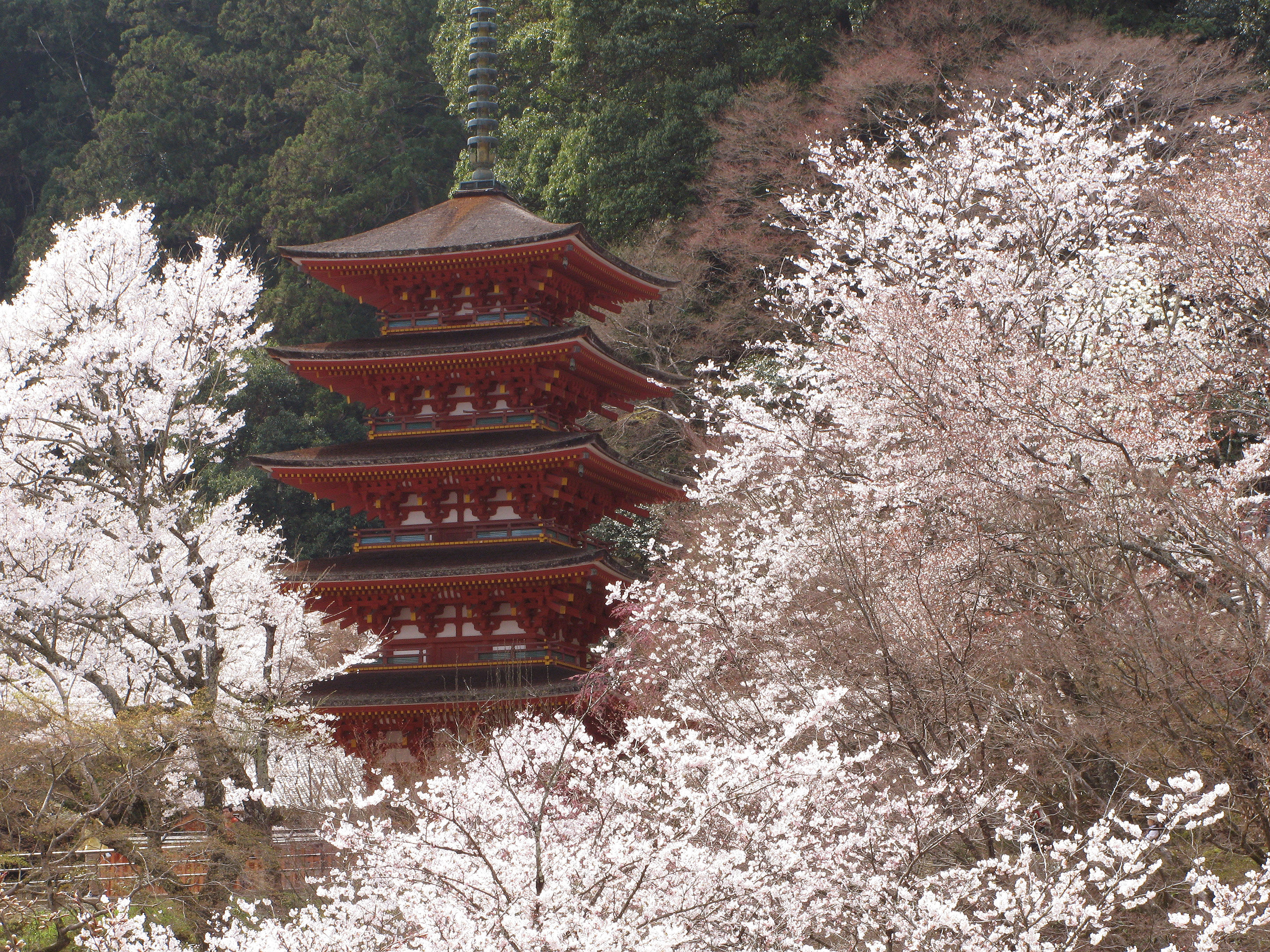
Pagoda

== See also ==
- List of National Treasures of Japan (crafts-others)
- List of National Treasures of Japan (temples)
- List of National Treasures of Japan (writings)
