= Hori Hidemasa =

Japanese retainer (1553–1590)

- 堀 秀政
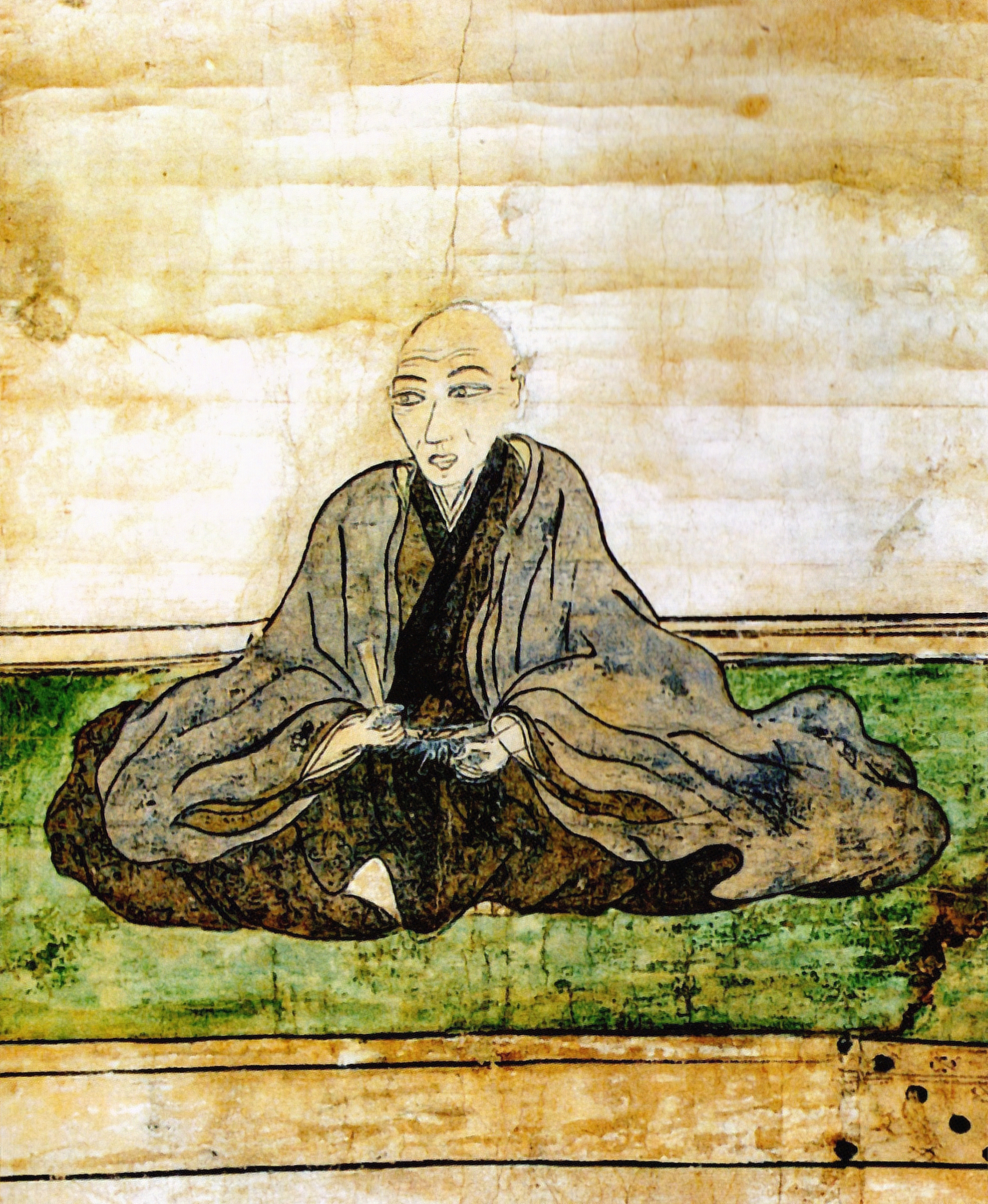

Lord of Sakata county
- In office 1582–1590
- Succeeded by: Hori Hideharu

Personal details
- Born: 1553 Mino Province
- Died: June 28, 1590 (aged 36–37) Mino Province
- Relations: Hori Hideharu (son)
- Nickname: Hori Kyūtarō

Military service
- Allegiance: Oda clan Toyotomi clan
- Rank: Bugyō
- Battles/wars: Ikkō-ikki Campaign; Tenshō Iga War; Siege of Takatō; Battle of Yamazaki; Battle of Komaki and Nagakute; Siege of Negoro-ji; Invasion of Shikoku; Kyushu Campaign; Siege of Odawara

Hori Hidemasa (堀 秀政; 1553 – June 28, 1590), also known as Hori Kyūtarō (堀 久太郎), was a samurai retainer of Oda Nobunaga and Toyotomi Hideyoshi during Japan's Sengoku period. He was Nobunaga page, and one of Hideyoshi's greatest generals. He commanded Hideyoshi forces in several of his more important battles.

== Early life ==
Born in Mino Province, he was raised along with his cousin Hori Naomasa, by his uncle, an Ikkō priest. Originally serving Ōtsu Chōji and Kinoshita Hideyoshi.

At the age of 13 he became Oda Nobunaga's page. By sixteen, he was assigned prefect (bugyō) in charge of the construction of shōgun Ashikaga Yoshiaki's residence at Hongaku-ji, working with the likes of Sugaya Nagayori, Ōtsu Nagaaki, Yabe Iesada, Hasegawa Hidekazu, Manmi Shigemoto and Fukutomi Hidekatsu. Gradually, however, he began to spend more and more time on the battlefield.

== Military life ==
=== Service under Nobunaga ===
In 1575, he aided in Nobunaga's assaults on the Ikkō-ikki of Echizen Province, and fought the Saika Ikki two years later, leading Nobunaga's army alongside Hashiba Hideyoshi and Sakuma Nobumori. He also led a corps of arquebusiers in a number of battles.

Though some sources say he also controlled Nagahama Castle at this point, most sources indicate the castle belonged to Hideyoshi. While there was a nearby fief held by a Buddhist temple, with the same kokutaka (assessment of land-value in koku), these should not be confused. He was bugyō throughout this period, and oversaw the construction of a mansion for Portuguese missionaries, and playing a role in hosting the 1579 Azuchi religious debate (安土宗論, Azuchi shūron). Serving as Nobunaga's representative, he also hosted the likes of Tokugawa Ieyasu, Niwa Nagahide, and others.

In 1581, Hidemasa fought in Second Tenshō Iga War and in 1582 followed Oda Nobutada into battle against the Takeda clan at Siege of Takatō and was granted the fief of Sakata Domain, in Ōmi Province, with an income of 25,000 koku.

=== Service under Hideyoshi ===
In 1582, Oda Nobunaga was killed in the Honnō-ji Incident. Hidemasa came to once more serve Toyotomi Hideyoshi, after the latter's political maneuvering made him effective lord of much of the Oda's former lands.

Hidemasa aided Hideoyshi in the 1582 battle of Yamazaki, along with Nakagawa Kiyohide and Takayama Ukon, and received great praise the following year from Tokugawa Ieyasu for his battle prowess. At that time, Hideyoshi had just begun fighting Shibata Katsuie, and Ieyasu expressed his confidence that the campaign would go smoothly.

Hidemasa was promoted to the fifth rank, appointed to the Saemonfu (左衛門, Court Security Office), and granted Sawayama in Ōmi Province as his fief, with an income of 90,000 koku. He then arranged negotiations for Hideyoshi with the Ikkō sect which had fervently opposed Nobunaga; the head priest of Renshō-ji was Hidemasa's cousin Hori Rokuemon, and so the negotiations went quite smoothly.

Hidemasa led portions of Hideyoshi's forces once again, in the 1584 Battle of Komaki and Nagakute, in which they suffered a crushing defeat at the hands of the Tokugawa army. Ambushed by Ōsuga Yasutaka and Sakakibara Yasumasa, they successfully held off their attackers for a time, but upon meeting the main Tokugawa force of 9,000, were forced to retreat.

The following year, Hideyoshi became Kampaku (Imperial regent), and Hidemasa was promoted to the fourth rank at court, and appointed to a new post as well. Following the siege of Negoro-ji and the invasion of Shikoku (1585), he was given the lands of the late Niwa Nagahide, Kita no shō in Echizen Province, with an income of 180,000 koku.

During the 1587 Kyūshū Campaign, Hidemasa once again led the vanguard of Hideyoshi's forces. As various castles fell, and fifty or so Satsuma warriors were captured, he released them rather than killing them. It is said that he had absolutely no rest for much of the campaign, fighting battle after battle with no break.

The 1590 siege of Odawara would see Hidemasa commanding in battle for the last time. He commanded the left flank of the besieging army with a number of great warriors under him, and captured a number of surrounding fortifications.

== Death ==
During the Siege of Odawara on June 28, 1590, Hidemasa suddenly fell very ill and died. His lands and posts were inherited by his eldest son, Hori Hideharu.

== Notes ==
- Most of the content of this article is derived from the corresponding article on the Japanese Wikipedia.
- Turnbull, Stephen (1998). The Samurai Sourcebook. London: Cassell & Co.
