= Negoro-shū =

Japanese order of warrior monks

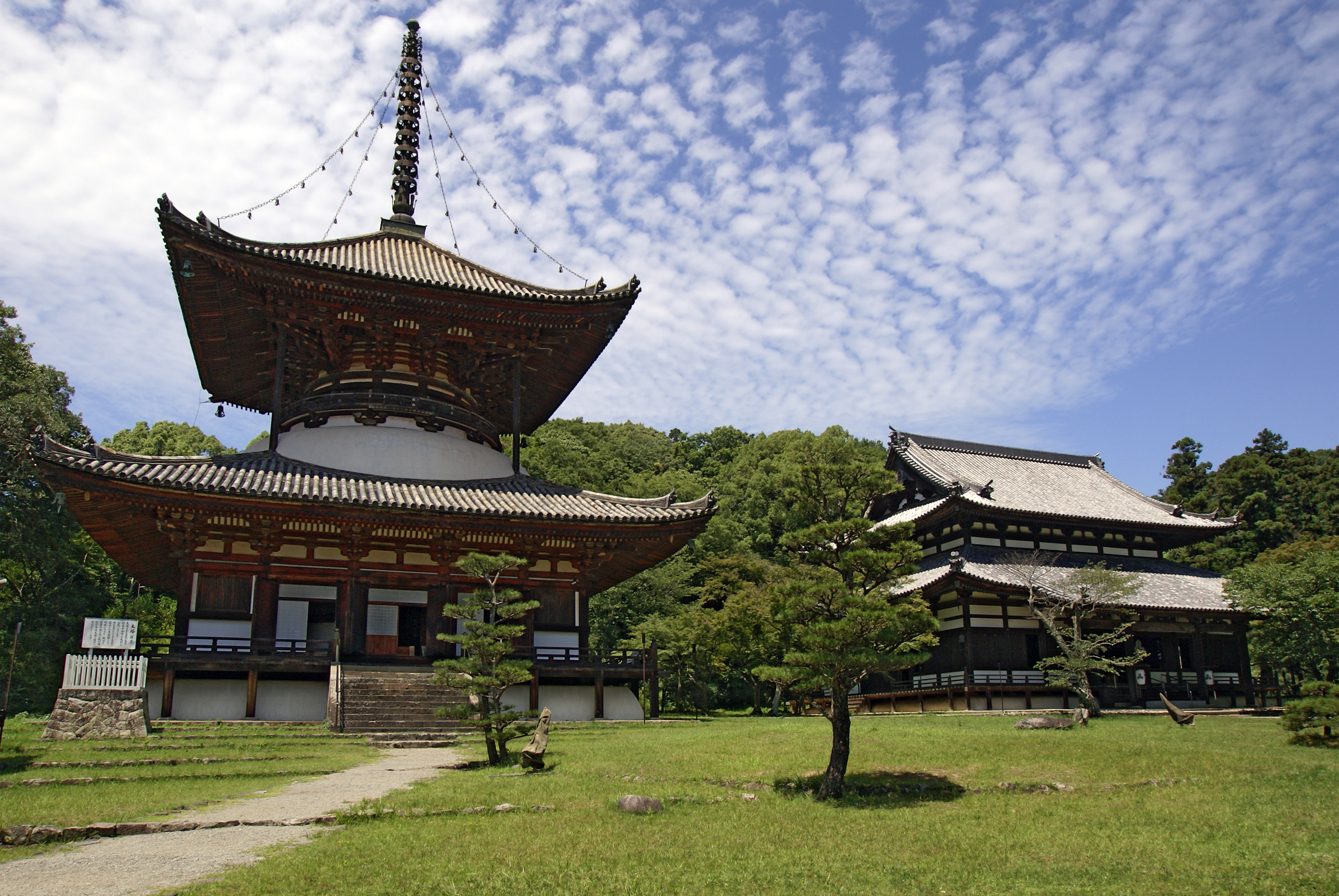
Negoro-ji temple in 2007

The Negoro-shū (根来衆) were an order of warrior monks based in Negoro-ji temple, in Japan's Kii Province. They were famous for their skill with firearms, as well as with more traditional monk weapons like the naginata. Negoro-ji, along with many other warrior monasteries, came under siege at the end of the 16th century; in 1585, the temple was burned to the ground by the forces of Toyotomi Hideyoshi.

The monks of Negoro-ji were devotees of the Shingi sect of Shingon Buddhism, but were allied with monks of other sects, such as the Ikkō-ikki, as well as with Tokugawa Ieyasu, a chief rival of Toyotomi Hideyoshi. They aided their allies in a number of battles, including the siege of Ishiyama Hongan-ji, the main base of the Ikkō-ikki. When their own temple came under siege in 1585, its inhabitants are estimated to have numbered 30,000 to 50,000, though many escaped before the siege and sought refuge in Ōta castle, home of the Saiga Ikki. Following the destruction, twenty-five of the survivors joined Tokugawa Ieyasu's army, forming the core of his firearms squads.

An insight into the daily lives of the Negoro-gumi was provided by Father Gaspar Vilela, a Jesuit missionary who visited the temple. He compared the monks to the Knights of Rhodes, devoted warriors who would give anything to fight for their religion. However, he observed that the monks of Negoroji focused far more on military preparations than on prayer, and that many had not even taken monastic vows. Vilela was impressed by their martial prowess, the extent of their daily training, and the strength of their weapons and armor. These monks were not only expert arquebusiers, but also some of the best gunsmiths in the country, and accomplished fletchers. They celebrated military victories with all the pleasures enjoyed by a secular force, indulging in many things that an ascetic life ought to prohibit, such as wine, women and song.
