= Siege of Negoro-ji =

- Part of the Sengoku period
Date	1585
Location	Negoro-ji, Kii Province, Japan
Result	Toyotomi Hideyoshi victory

Belligerents
Negoro-shū, the warrior monks of Negoro-ji	Forces of Toyotomi Hideyoshi

Commanders and leaders
Saika Ikki	Toyotomi Hideyoshi; Hosokawa Fujitaka; Hori Hidemasa; Takayama Shigetomo; Tōdō Takatora

Strength
30,000–50,000	6,000

The siege of Negoro-ji (根来寺の戦い, Negoro-ji no Tatakai) was commanded by Toyotomi Hideyoshi, a former vassal of Oda Nobunaga, who came to inherit his armies, his land, and his rivalry with the warrior monks of Japan when Nobunaga was killed in 1582. Thus, in a way this was the next in a series of many sieges that Oda Nobunaga's forces undertook in the 1580s, against the many fortresses of warrior monks.

== Background ==
The Negoro-gumi, the warrior monks of Negoro-ji, were quite skilled in the use of firearms, and were devout followers of Shingi, a branch of the Shingon sect of Buddhism. They were allied with the Ikkō-ikki, and with Tokugawa Ieyasu, one of Toyotomi's chief rivals. In particular, they attracted Hideyoshi's ire for their support of Tokugawa in the Battle of Komaki and Nagakute the previous year.

== Siege ==
After attacking a number of other warrior monk outposts in the area, Hideyoshi's force turned to the Negoro-ji, attacking it from two sides. By this time, many of the Negoro-gumi had already fled to Ōta Castle, home of the Saiga Ikki; the numbers present during the siege are unclear. The complex was set aflame, beginning with the residences of the priests, and Hideyoshi's samurai cut down monks as they escaped the blazing buildings.
