= Kakuban =

Japanese Shingon Buddhist priest and reformer

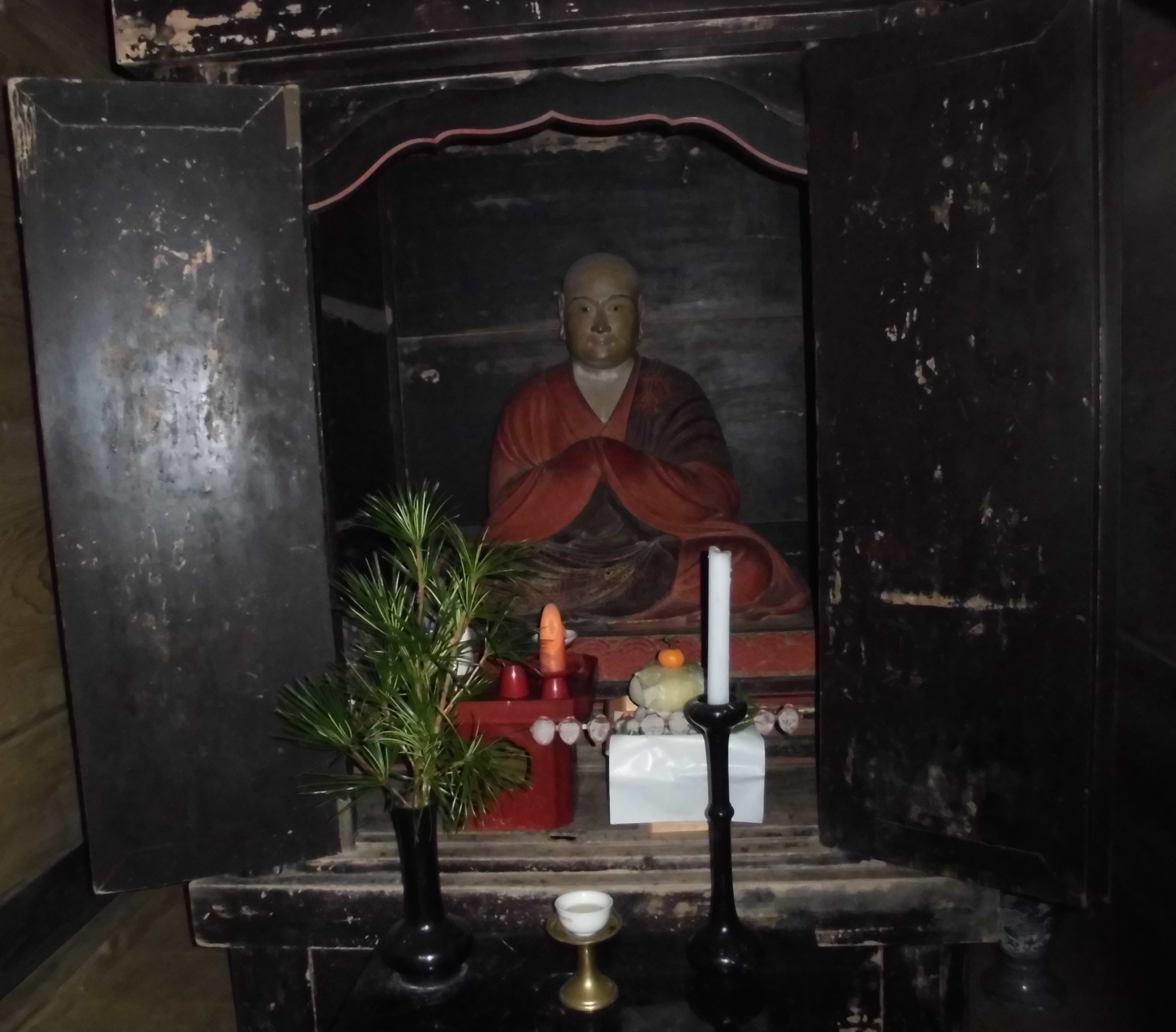
Kakuban sculpture (Mitsugon-dō), Oku-no-in, Kōya-san

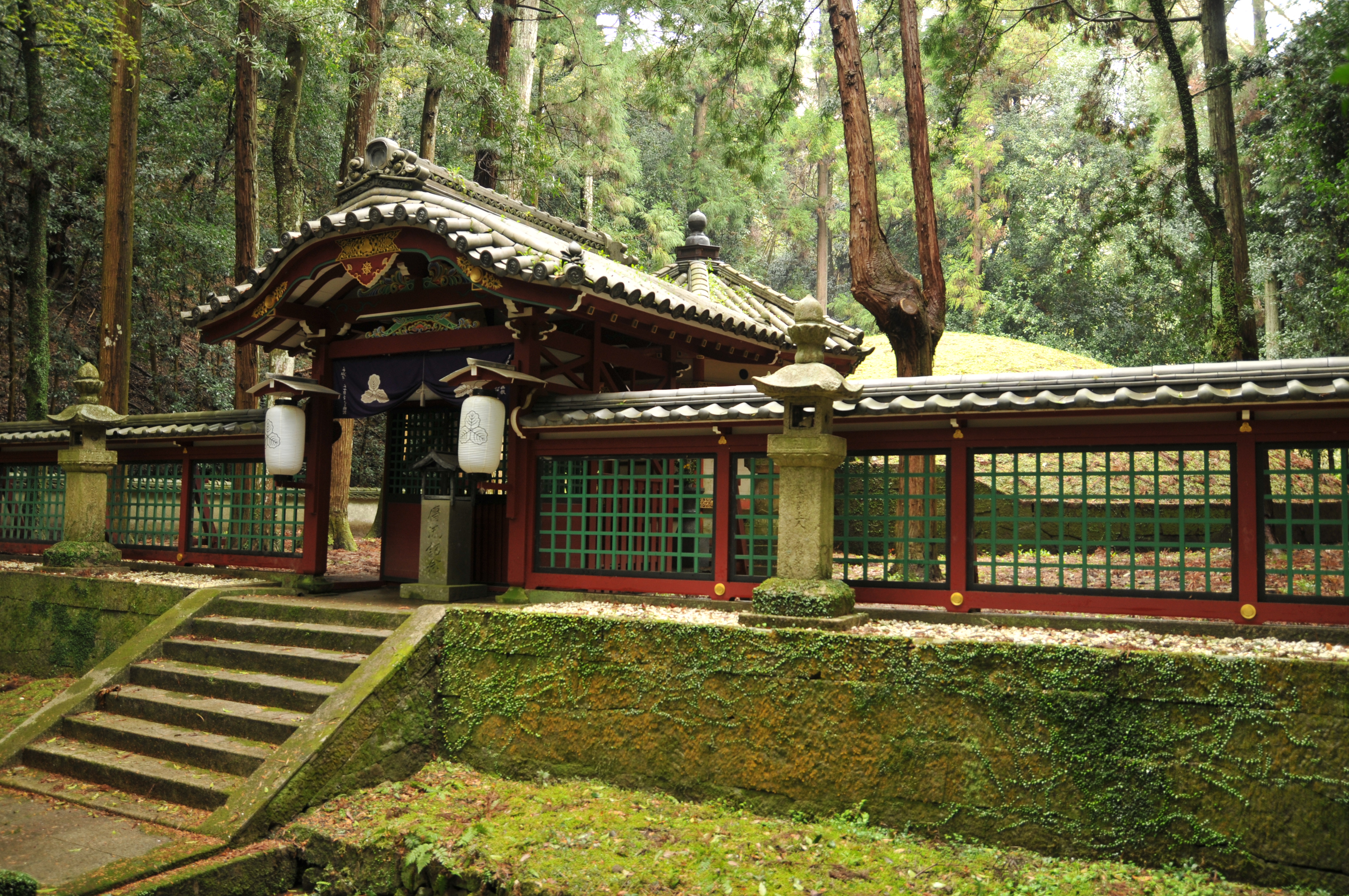
Mausoleum of Kakuban in Negoro-ji

Kakuban (覚鑁/覺鑁; 1095–1143), known posthumously as Kōgyō-Daishi (興教大師) was a priest of the Shingon sect of Buddhism in Japan and credited as a reformer, though his efforts also led to a schism between Kogi Shingon-shū (古儀真言宗, Old Shingon) and Shingi Shingon-shū (新義真言宗, New Shingon). Kakuban is also famous for his introduction of the "esoteric nembutsu".

== Biography ==
Kakuban was born in Fujitsu-no-shō (Hizen Province, nowadays part of Kashima City, Saga Prefecture) about three hundred years after Shingon Buddhism was first founded by Kūkai (空海). His given name was Yachitose-maro (弥千歳麿).

The third of four children, his father died at the age of 10, so he renounced the world at age 13 to enter the priesthood and became a pupil of the famous teacher, Kanjo (寛助) in Kyoto, who in turn had founded the Jōju-in (成就院). Kakuban had briefly studied the Kusha and Hossō teachings at Kōfuku-ji in Nara before returning to his master. At that time, he was given the ordination name of Shōgaku-bō Kakuban (正覚房覚鑁). After prolonged training in Buddhism at Tōdai-ji in Nara, the twenty-year-old received full ordination. Kakuban left for Mount Kōya (Kōya-san), then the center of the Shingon sect, to pursue further learning of Shingon Buddhism and its founder under the tutelage of Shōren (青蓮), a devout follower of the Pure Land teachings.

By age 30, he received patronage from the noble families in Kyoto, including Cloistered Emperor Toba's permission to build the Denbō-in (伝法院) on Mt. Koya as a center for studying Buddhism. The following year, he constructed the Daidenbō-in (大伝法院).

=== Shingon school schism ===
When he was thirty-six, Kakuban took leadership in the revival of the Shingon Sect, by attempting to unify the existing branches of Ono (小野) and Hirosawa (広沢). Further, he attempted to assert authority of the Shingon sect from Mt. Koya, not the traditional seat at Tō-ji in Kyoto. Eventually, he gathered an increasing throng of followers and became the chief priest (座主, zasu) of both the temples Daidenbō-in and Kongōbu-ji. In time, he came to govern the entire religious district of Kōyasan as the chief priest under Imperial decree. This led to animosity from some monks, who called for his expulsion. Kakuban soon resigned from his post as chief priest (1135), and retired to Mitsugon-in (密厳院).

The animosity continued, however, and armed monks burned down the Denbō-in Temple in 1139. Kakuban and his pupils fled to Negoro-ji, where Kakuban ended his days at the age of 49 on December 12, 1143. According to legend, he died while sitting in the lotus posture, facing an image of Vairocana's Pure Land. His ashes remain buried in a tomb in the Okunoin cemetery there. Later he was given the posthumous title of Kōgyō-daishi (興教大師, Great Master of Prosperous teachings) by Emperor Higashiyama in 1690.

One of his disciples, Raiyu (頼瑜, 1226–1304) moved the Daidenbō-in and the Mitsugon-in Halls to Negoro-ji in 1288 and established the independence of a new school called Shingi Shingon (新義真言宗, New Shingon).

== Teachings ==
Kakuban wrote many works elaborating on the foundational teachings of Kūkai, as well as existing esoteric Buddhist rituals and practices.

=== Pure Land thought and the esoteric nembutsu ===
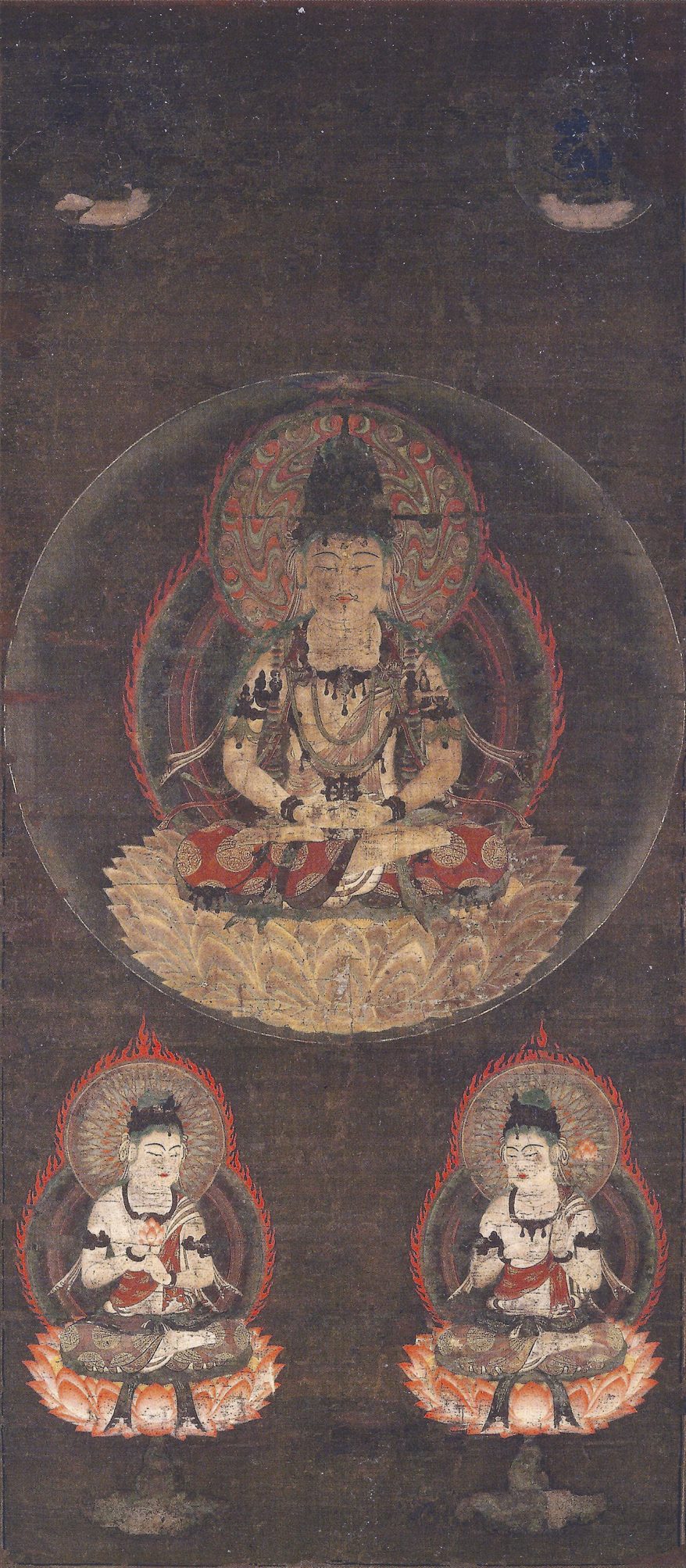
A Kamakura period Shingon Amida triad at Daigoji

Some of Kakuban's most influential writings centered around the esoteric interpretations of the Pure Land practice of nembutsu, known as himitsu nembutsu (秘密念仏). In his The Esoteric Meaning of Amida (阿弥陀秘釈, Amida Hisshaku), Kakuban describes each of the syllables of the nembutsu, their underlying esoteric meaning, and the important symbolism of breath as life, and as a means of recitation. Similarly, he also explains the meaning of various other Shingon mantras related to Amitabha Buddha.

Kakuban’s Pure Land thought integrated esoteric Shingon thought with Pure Land Buddhism, emphasizing non-duality and the immanence of buddhahood, and thus challenging the widespread assumption that Pure Land practice was a dualistic endeavor. Central to Kakuban’s system is the assertion that Amitābha is not a distinct or remote buddha, but rather a functional expression of the Shingon supreme buddha, Dainichi (Mahāvairocana). In this view, the distinction between the Pure Land deity and the esoteric dharmakāya is only provisional; the two are ultimately identical in essence. This identification grounds Kakuban’s broader argument that the Pure Land itself is not a separate, transcendent domain situated beyond this defiled world. Instead, the locus of the Pure Land is to be understood through Shingon mandalic symbolism, with Amitābha’s realm interpreted as a manifestation of Dainichi’s cosmic presence within all beings.

Kakuban’s writings elaborate this interpretation through a reconfiguration of Pure Land imagery in esoteric ritual terms. His presentation of the “Mitsugon Pure Land” describes a mandalic environment corresponding to the central Mandala of Dainichi Nyorai, complete with symbolic architecture, sacred adornments, and the presence of the five wisdom buddhas. Although he adopts motifs familiar from canonical Pure Land scriptures, these are deployed to illustrate a tantric visualization associated with the practitioner’s own mind and body. For Kakuban, the Pure Land becomes the interiorized space in which the practitioner realizes the identity of individual consciousness with the dharmakāya.

This worldview leads Kakuban to articulate a distinctive understanding of the nembutsu, the central practice of traditional Pure Land Buddhism. Rather than construing it as a verbal appeal to an external savior, he interprets the nembutsu chant ("Namu Amida Butsu") as an intrinsic function of the body-mind complex, where the breath (vayu), vital energy (prana), and the natural rhythm of inhalation and exhalation serve as the true invocation of the nembutsu, which is seen as an expression of the innate purity of the practitioner’s own buddha-nature. In this esoteric reading, the act of calling on Amitābha is inseparable from the recognition that Amitābha’s essence is already present within the practitioner as Dainichi’s fundamental wisdom. This realization can thus lead to the “bodily attainment of buddhahood” and anticipates later secret nenbutsu traditions.

Kakuban’s Pure Land teaching exerted long-term influence both within Shingon and beyond it, influencing the Hijiri at Mount Kōya and through them, other schools like Ippen's Ji-shu. His identification of Amitābha with Dainichi and his esoteric reframing of Pure Land praxis informed the development of later secret nenbutsu lineages and contributed to heterodox currents within early modern Jōdo Shinshū, including underground kakure nenbutsu communities. Although Kakuban's work stands apart from the mainstream Pure Land movements of the Kamakura period, it represents one of the most sophisticated and influential attempts to integrate Pure Land soteriology with esoteric Buddhist metaphysics.

== Sources ==
- Kakuban (2004) [c.1136]. "The Mitsugonin Confession; The Illuminating Secret Commentary on the Five Cakras and the Nine Syllables". Shingon texts (PDF). Translated by Todaro, Dale A. Berkeley, Calif.: Numata Center for Buddhist Translation and Research. Taishø Volume 79, Numbers 2527, 2514, Translated from the Japanese. Archived from the original (PDF) on 2015-03-22.
- Kakuban (Fall 1994). "The Esoteric Meaning of 'Amida'" by Kakuban". Pacific World (New series 10). Translated by Inagaki, Hisao: 102–115. Archived from the original on 2014-08-21.
