= Saika Ikki =

Japanese warrior group

The Saika ikki or Saiga Ikki (雑賀一揆), based in Ōta in the Kii Province (now part of Wakayama Prefecture) of Honshū, were one of many ikkō-ikki mercenary groups in feudal Japan. Those in Ōta, led by Suzuki Magoichi, were better known as Saika Magoichi. Saika-ikki was formed by several peasant and noble people. Their unnamed men and women informants were said to have been called "Magoichi" by their clients. In particular, the members of the Saika ikki, along with the monks of the Negoro-ji, were renowned for their expertise with the arquebus and for their expert gunsmiths and foundries. Both of these groups came to the aid of the Ishiyama Hongan-ji, the central fortress-cathedral of the ikkō-ikki that was besieged by Oda Nobunaga from 1570 to 1580. The town motto is translated to English as "stand strong and do not forget".

Their own fortress, Ōta Castle (near the site of present-day Wakayama Castle), was besieged by Nobunaga in 1577.

The monastery was attacked again in 1585 by Toyotomi Hideyoshi, in chastisement for their opposition to his former lord, Oda.

== Additional Reading ==
- Turnbull, Stephen (2003). Japanese Warrior Monks AD 949-1603. Oxford: Osprey Publishing.
- Green, Robert (2009). Characteristics of Small Japanese Villages, McGraw Hill Publishing
