= Negoro-ji =

Buddhist temple in Wakayama Prefecture, Japan

Negoro-ji 根来寺
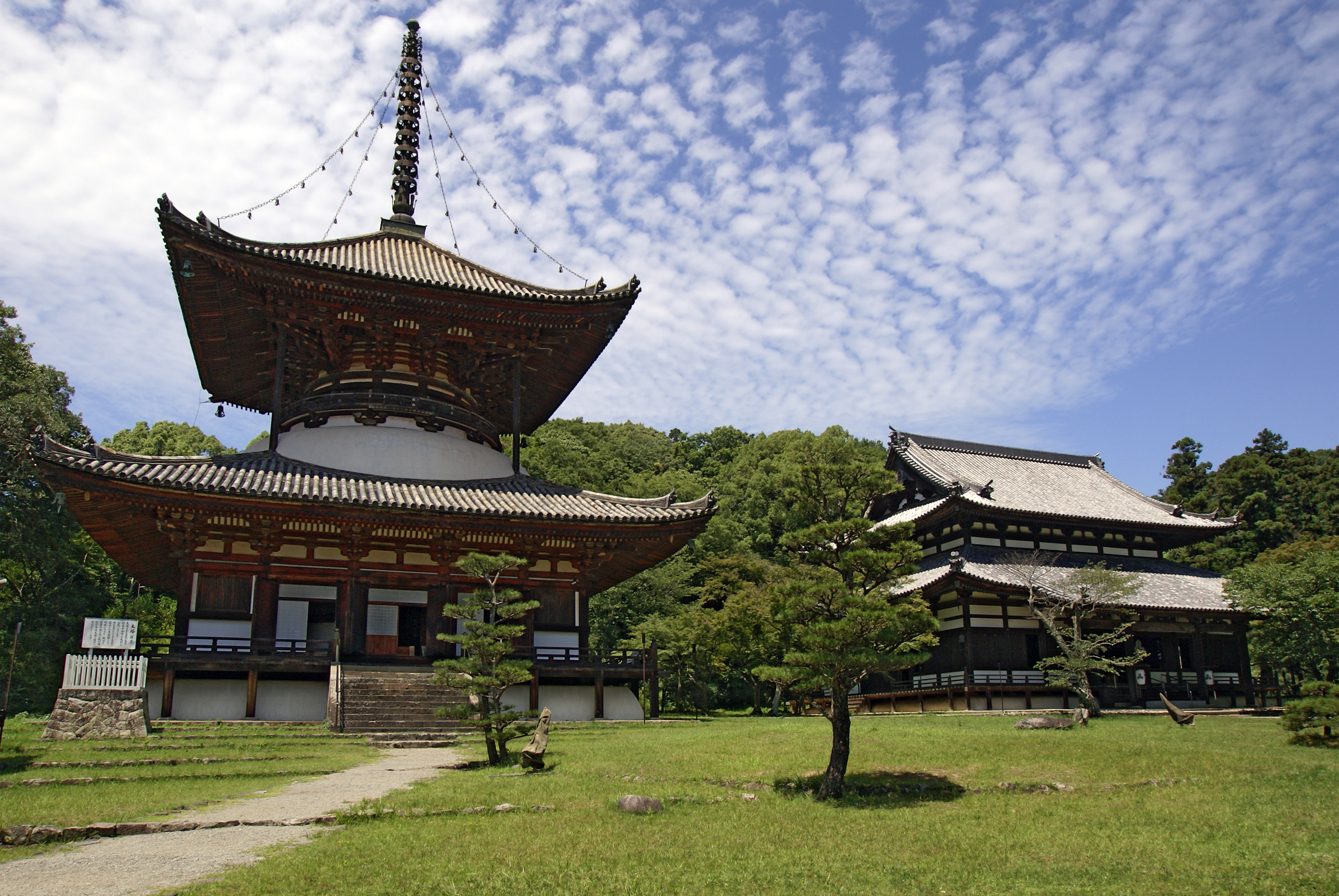
- Pagoda and Hondō of Negoro-ji

- Negoro-ji Negoro-ji (Japan)

Religion
- Affiliation: Buddhist
- Deity: Dainichi Nyorai
- Rite: Shingi-Shingon-shu
- Status: functioning

Location
- Location: 2286 Negoro, Iwade-shi, Wakayama-ken
- Country: Japan
- Interactive map of Negoro-ji 根来寺
- Coordinates: 34°17′13.76″N 135°18′59.96″E

Architecture
- Founder: Kakuban
- Completed: 1130
- National Treasure of Japan

Negoro-ji (根来寺) is a Buddhist temple located in the city of Iwade, Wakayama Prefecture in the Kansai region of Japan. Surrounded by the sacred peaks of the Katsuragi Mountains, the temple grounds were designated as a National Historic Site and a National Place of Scenic Beauty in 2007.

== History ==
In the latter half of the Heian period, from 1131, the priest Kakuban became head of the Shingon sect on Mount Kōya and attempted to reform the sect by reuniting the Ōno (小野) and Hirosawa (広沢) branches. He also attempted to assert the authority of Mount Kōya over the temple's metropolitan headquarters at Tō-ji in Kyoto. More controversially, he also attempted to introduce elements from Pure Land Buddhism into Shingon orthodoxy, including a new ritual called the himitsu nembutsu (秘密念仏, esoteric nembutsu). These reforms led to animosity form various reactionary political factions within the Shingon hierarchy, and facing calls for his expulsion, he resigned his posts in 1135 and retired to the chapel of Mitsugon-in (密厳院). However, the animosity against him continued, and after armed followers of the other factions burned down his residence in 1140, he fled further south into the mountains of Kii Province to an estate which he had received in 1132 from ex-Emperor Toba called Ichijō-zan Daidenpon Negoro-ji. He died at this location in 1143 and one of his disciples, Raiyū (頼瑜, 1226–1304) moved the Daidenbō-in and the Mitsugon-in chapels from Mount Kōya to Negoro-ji in 1288 and established the independence of a new school called Shingi Shingon (新義真言宗, New Shingon).

During the height of its influence in the late Muromachi period, the temple grew to become a huge religious city, with some 450 temples or chapels (2700 by some accounts) on the mountainside, controlling estates with a kokudaka of 720,000 koku and with some 10,000 Negoro-shū soldiers. Many of these soldiers were armed with matchlock rifles, which had recently been introduced to Japan. The temple was thus equivalent to a major Sengoku daimyō in terms of economic and military might. The temple enjoyed a good relationship with Oda Nobunaga, having assisted him during the Ishiyama Hongan-ji War from 1570 to 1580 and with Tokugawa Ieyasu during the Battle of Komaki and Nagakute in 1584; however, it earned the enmity of Toyotomi Hideyoshi, who launched an invasion of Kii Province in 1585. During the Siege of Negoro-ji most of the temple was burned down. Since the temple surrendered without resistance, its burning has been subject to some controversy. It is not clear if the temple was burned on Hideyoshi's orders, by its defenders, or as an act of arson by the attackers. The main surviving structure, the "Daidenhōdō" was dismantled and taken away for use as the Main Hall of Tenshō-ji, which Hideyoshi planned as Nobunaga's mausoleum in Funaokayama, Kyoto. However, Tenshō-ji was never built.

Following the Siege of Osaka in 1615 and the destruction of the Toyotomi clan, Tokugawa Ieyasu donated the buildings of Shoun-ji, a temple which had been built by Hideyoshi to mourn his infant son Tsurumatsu, to Negoro-ji, which had begun to rebuild. During the Edo period, the temple was patronized by the Kishū Tokugawa clan and continued to rebuild.

Archaeological excavations have been conducted on the temple grounds from 1976, and excavation also unearthed numerous relics such as pottery, lacquerware, Buddhist implements, and weapons. These relics are stored and exhibited at the "Iwade Civic Museum" built on the premises. However, the grounds of the temple are increasing threatened by urban encroachment.

== Cultural Properties ==
=== Buildings ===
Daitō (大塔), National Treasure

This is the largest Tahō-tō-style Pagoda in Japan, with a height of 40 meters and a width of 15 meters. It houses a statue of the Vairocana Buddha inside a circle of 12 pillars. It is believed to have started construction around 1480, and was completed around 1547. based on a record found within the structure during modern dismantling and repairs. The structure also has bullet holes from the attack on the temple by Toyotomi Hideyoshi in 1585.The structure was designated a National Treasure in 1899

Daishi-dō (大塔), Important Cultural Property

Along with the Daitō, this three by three bay structure is one of the few in the temple to ave survived in 1585 destruction of the temple. It is estimated to have been built around 1391 from the inscription on the principal image, a statue of Kōbō Daishi. It was designated as an Important Cultural Property in 1944.

Daidenhō-dō (大伝法堂), Important Cultural Property

This building was rebuilt in 1824 by local carpenters with the assistance of craftsmen from Osaka and Echigo. It is a large three by two bay structure with a large open interior space, and a tile roof.

The Daidenhō-dō contains three statues: a 3.5 meter seated Dainichi Nyorai, with a 3.43 meter seated Kongosatta on the left and a 3.3 meter seated Sonshō Butchō on the right. These states were completed between 1387 and 1405 and are thus much older than the building itself. The grouping is very unusual, and statues of Sonshō Butchō are also extremely rare in Japan. The group was designated an Important Cultural Property in 1994.

Kōmyōshingon-den (光明真言殿), Important Cultural Property

This building was reconstructed in 1801 and designated 2019

Daimon (大門), Important Cultural Property

The main gate of the temple was reconstructed in 1845 and designated 2019

Fudō-dō (不動堂), Important Cultural Property

This chapel dedicated to Fudō-myōō was reconstructed in the mid-Edo period and designated 2019

Gyōja-dō (行者堂), Important Cultural Property

This building was completed in the mid-Edo period and designated 2019

Shōten-dō (聖天堂), Important Cultural Property

This building was completed in the mid-Edo period and designated 2019

== Gallery ==
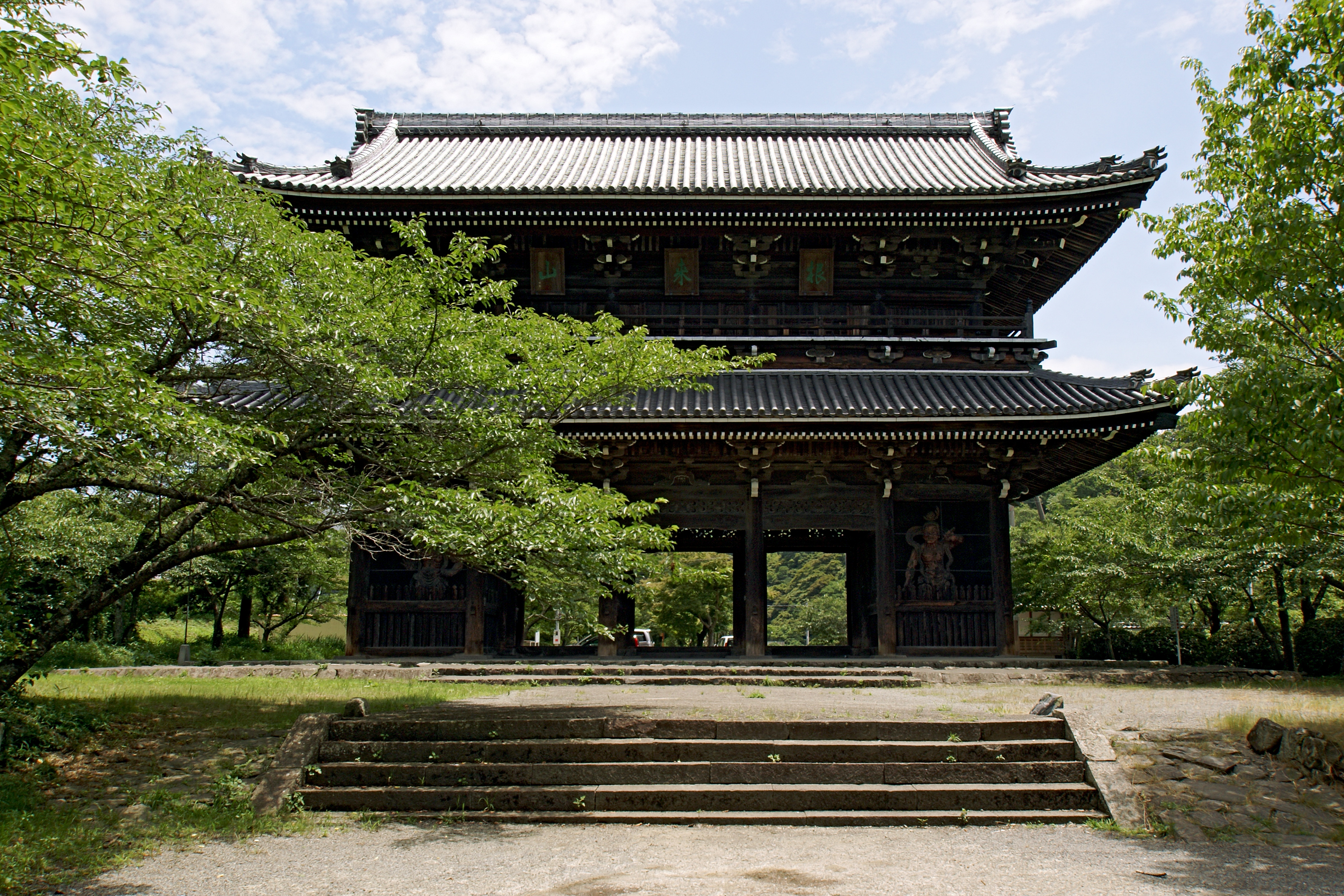
Daimon

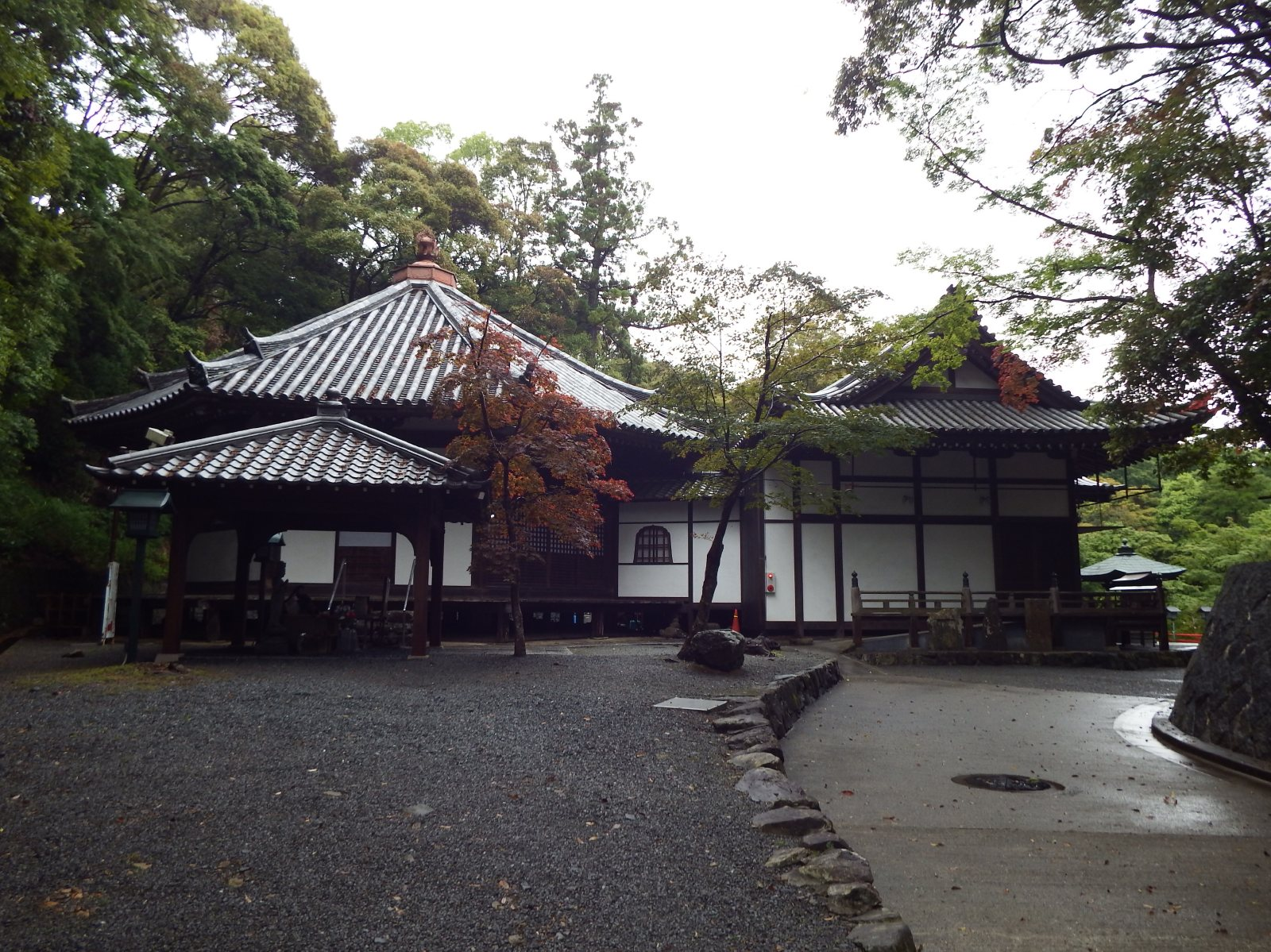
Fudō-dō

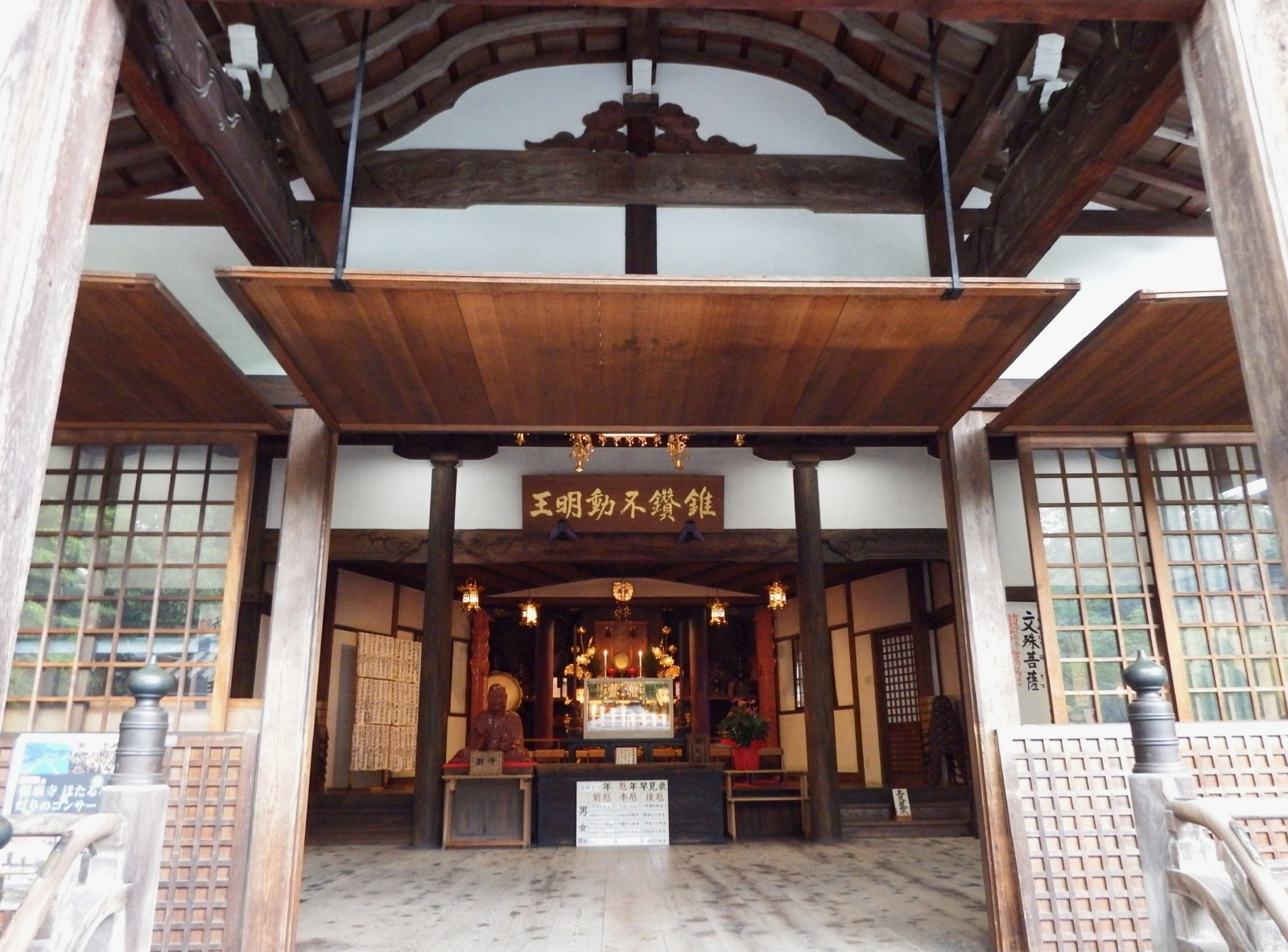
Fudō-dō interior

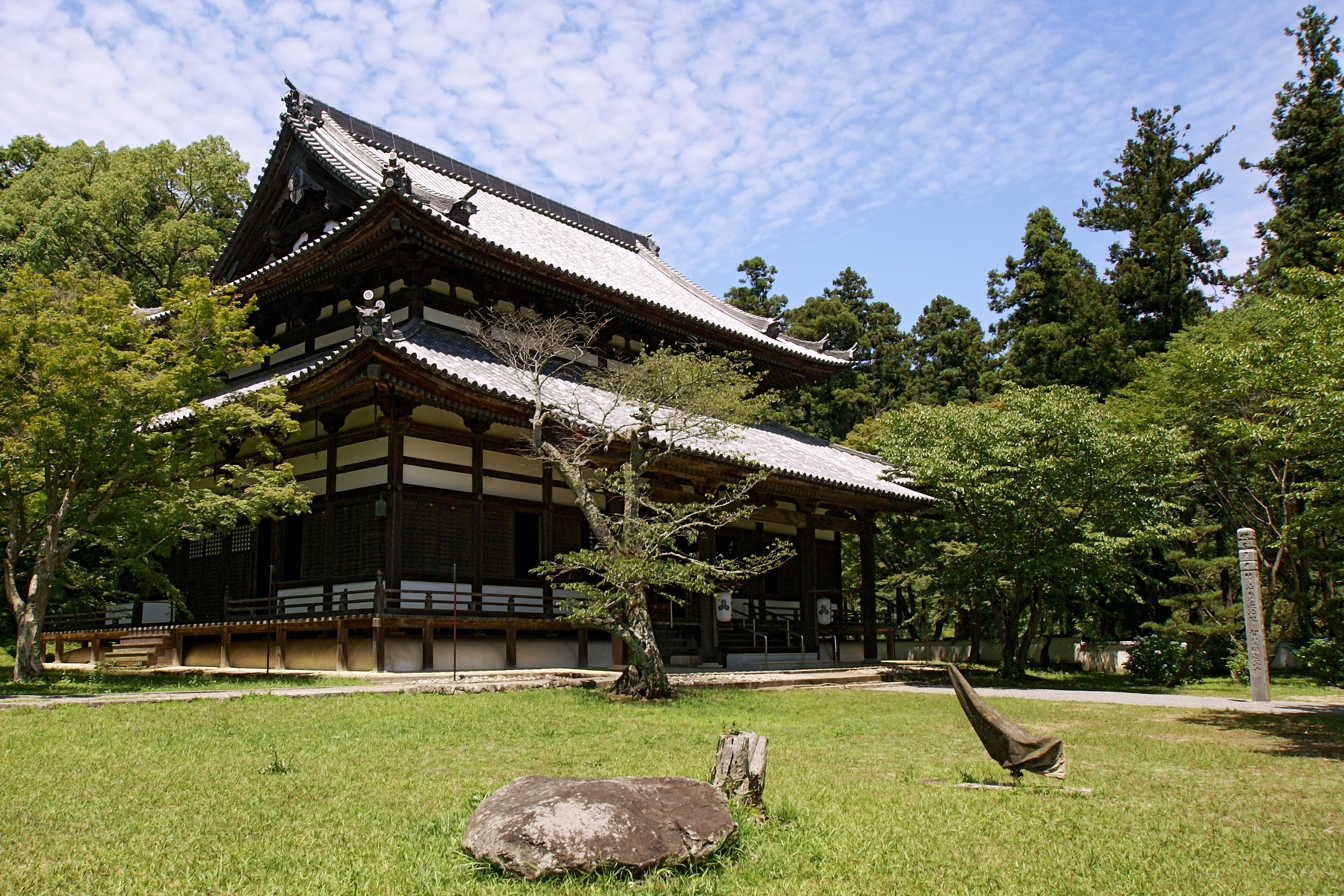
Daidenhō-dō

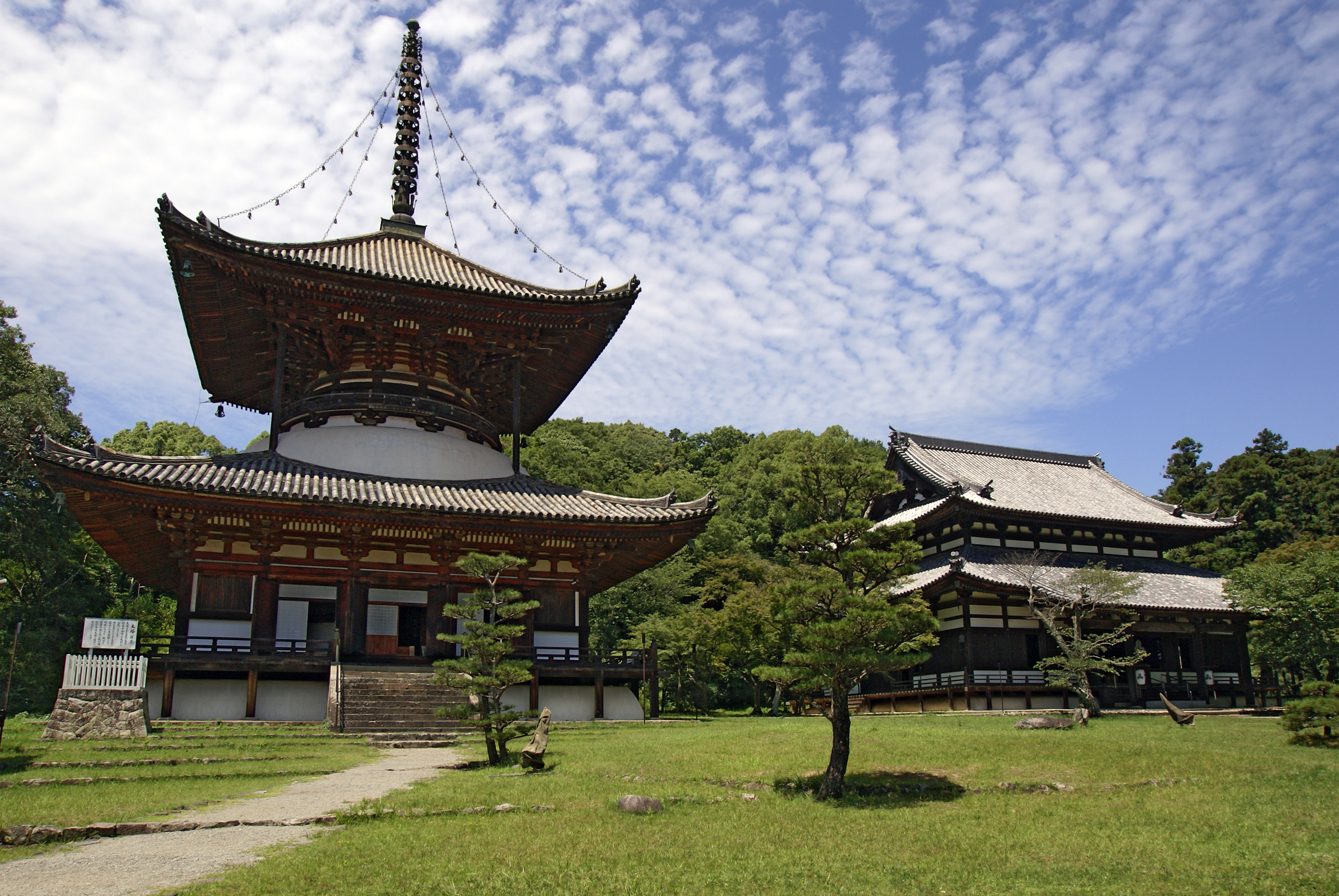
Daitō Pagoda

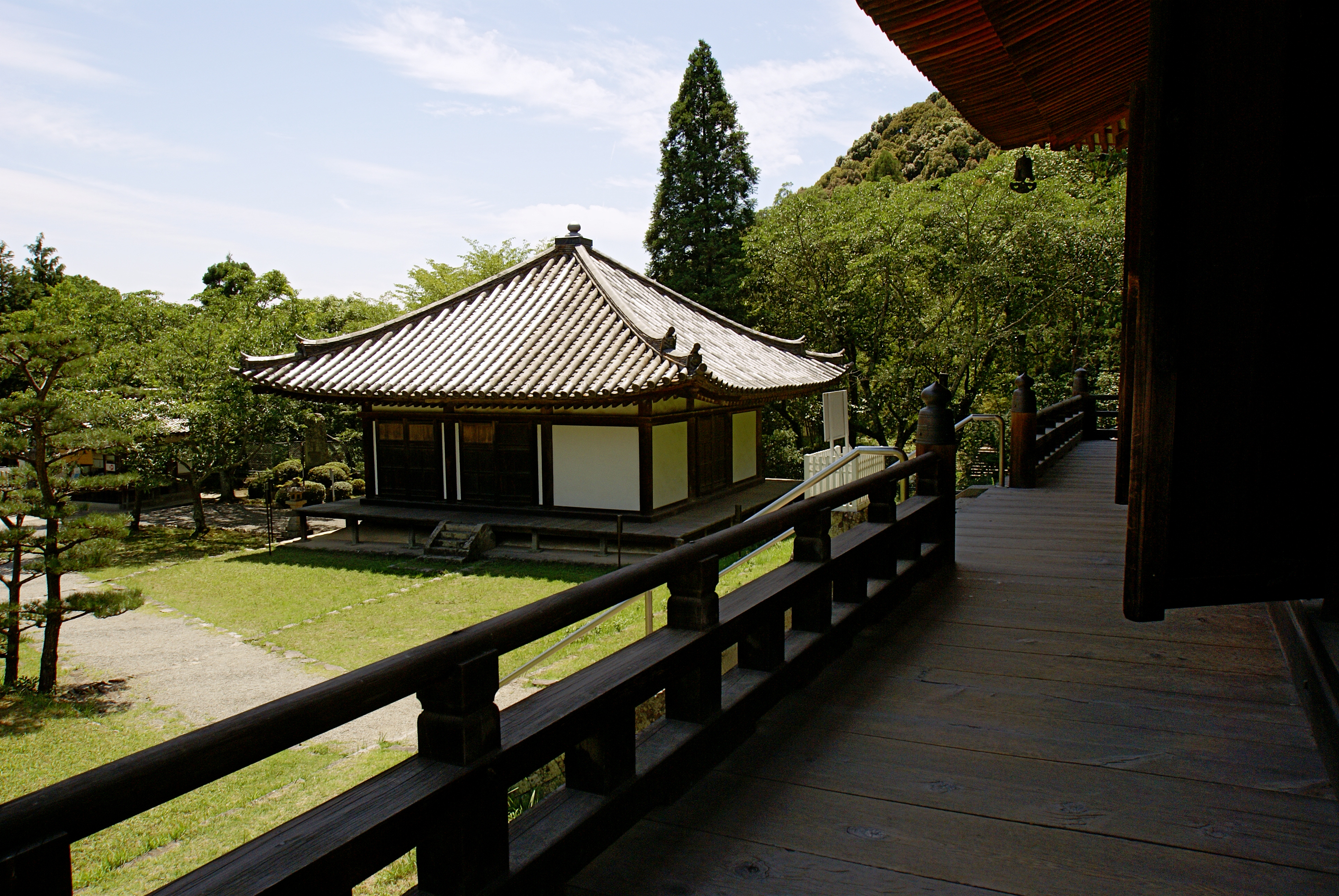
Daishi-dō

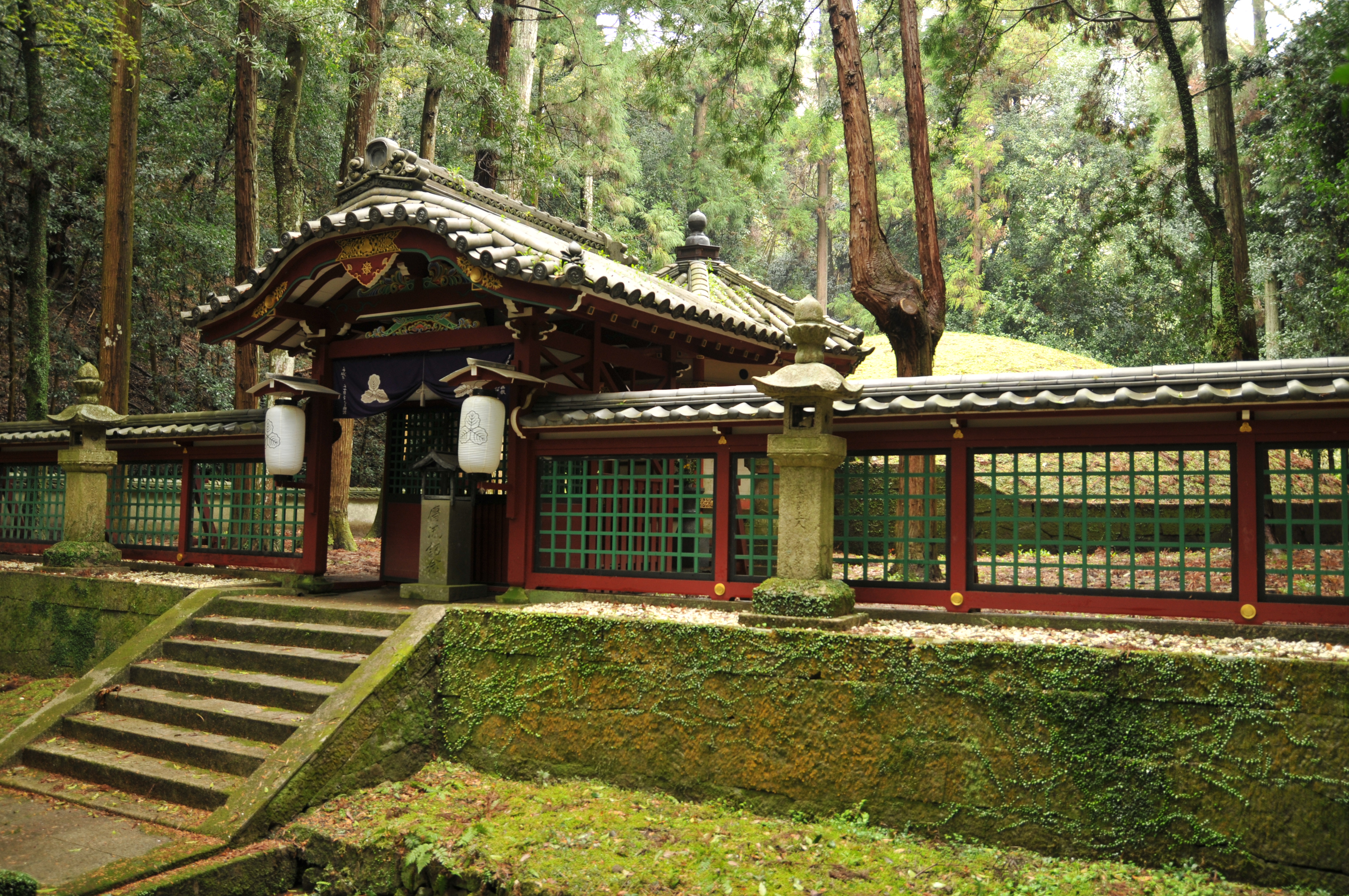
Oku-no-in

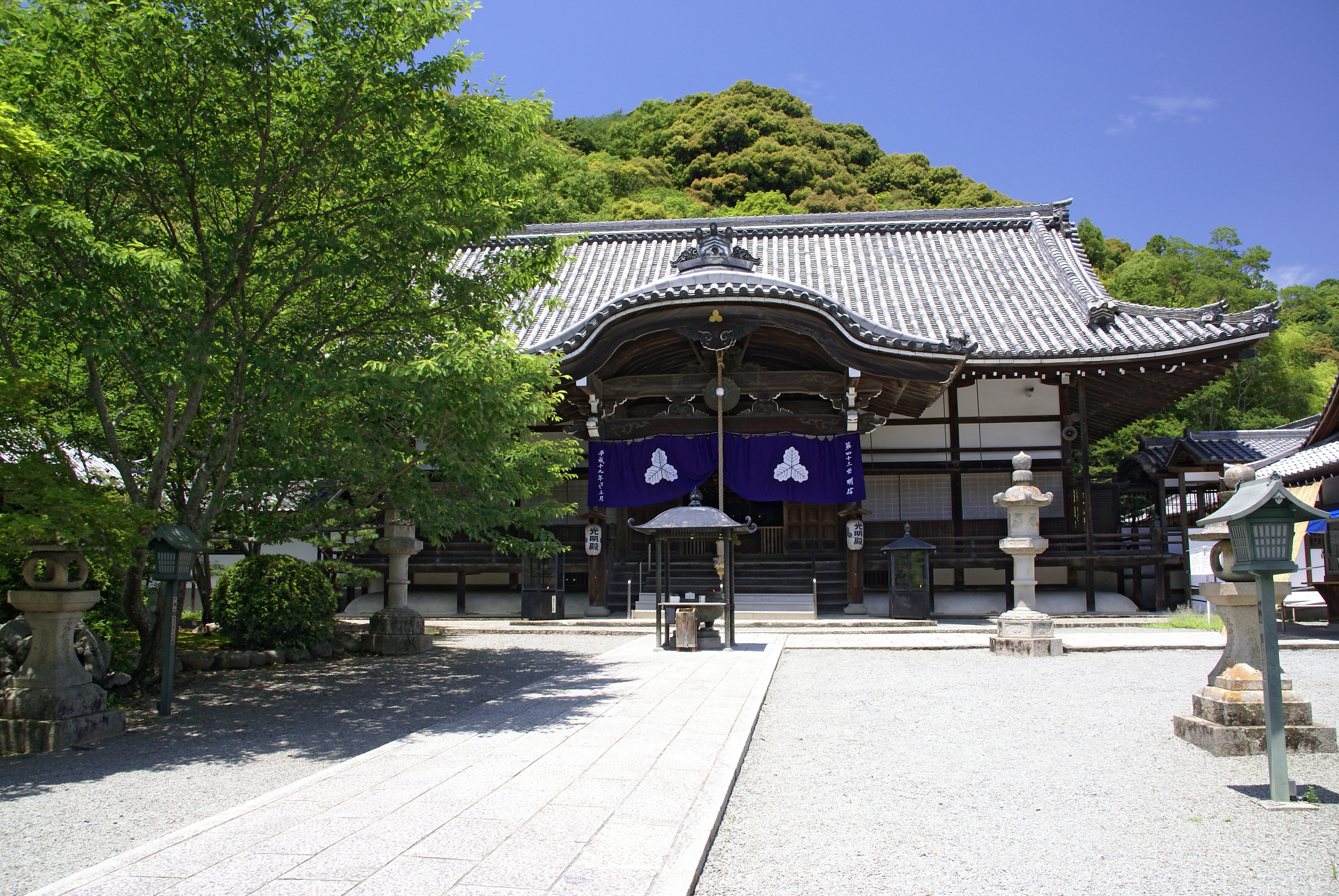
Kōmyōshingon-den

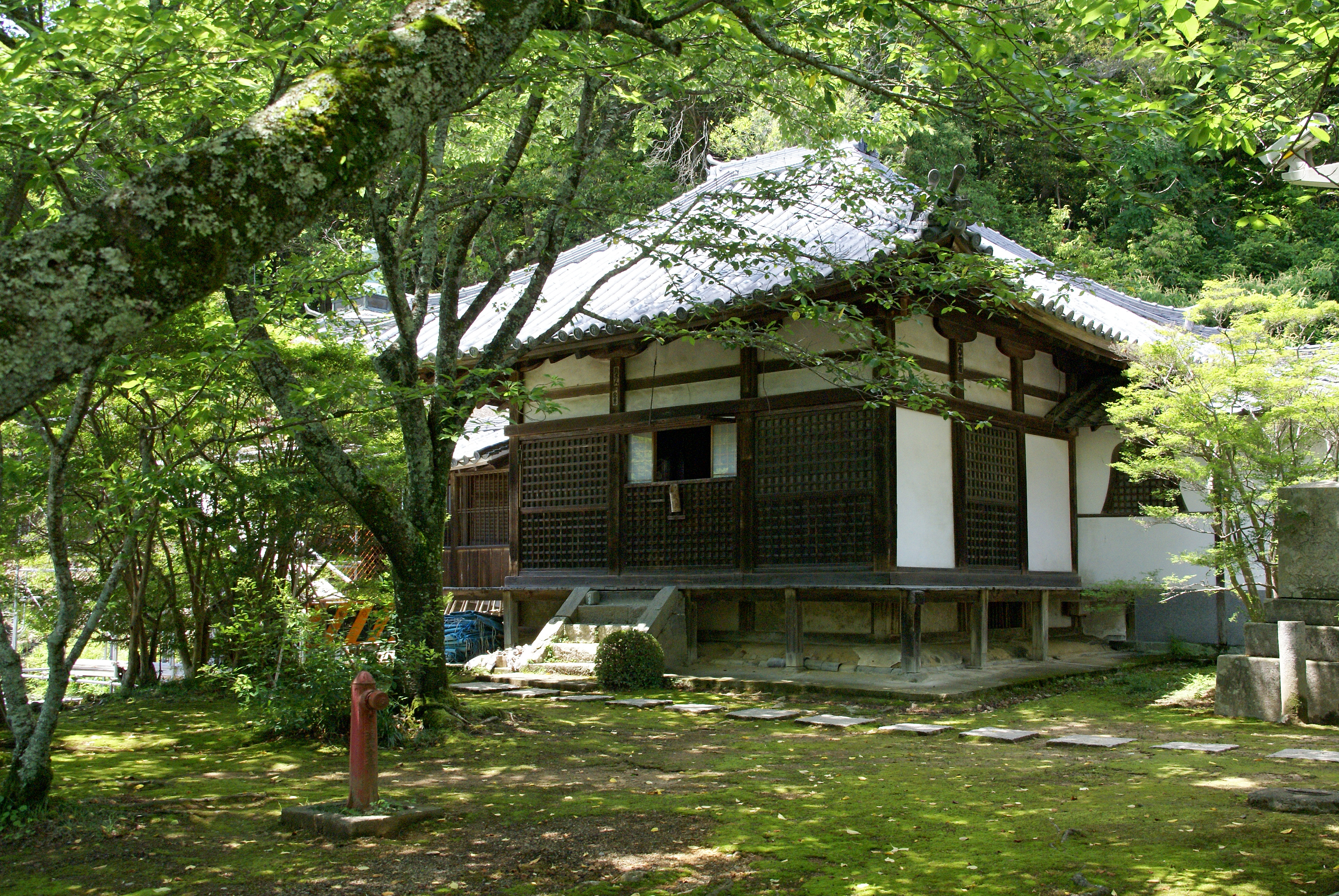
Gyōja-dō

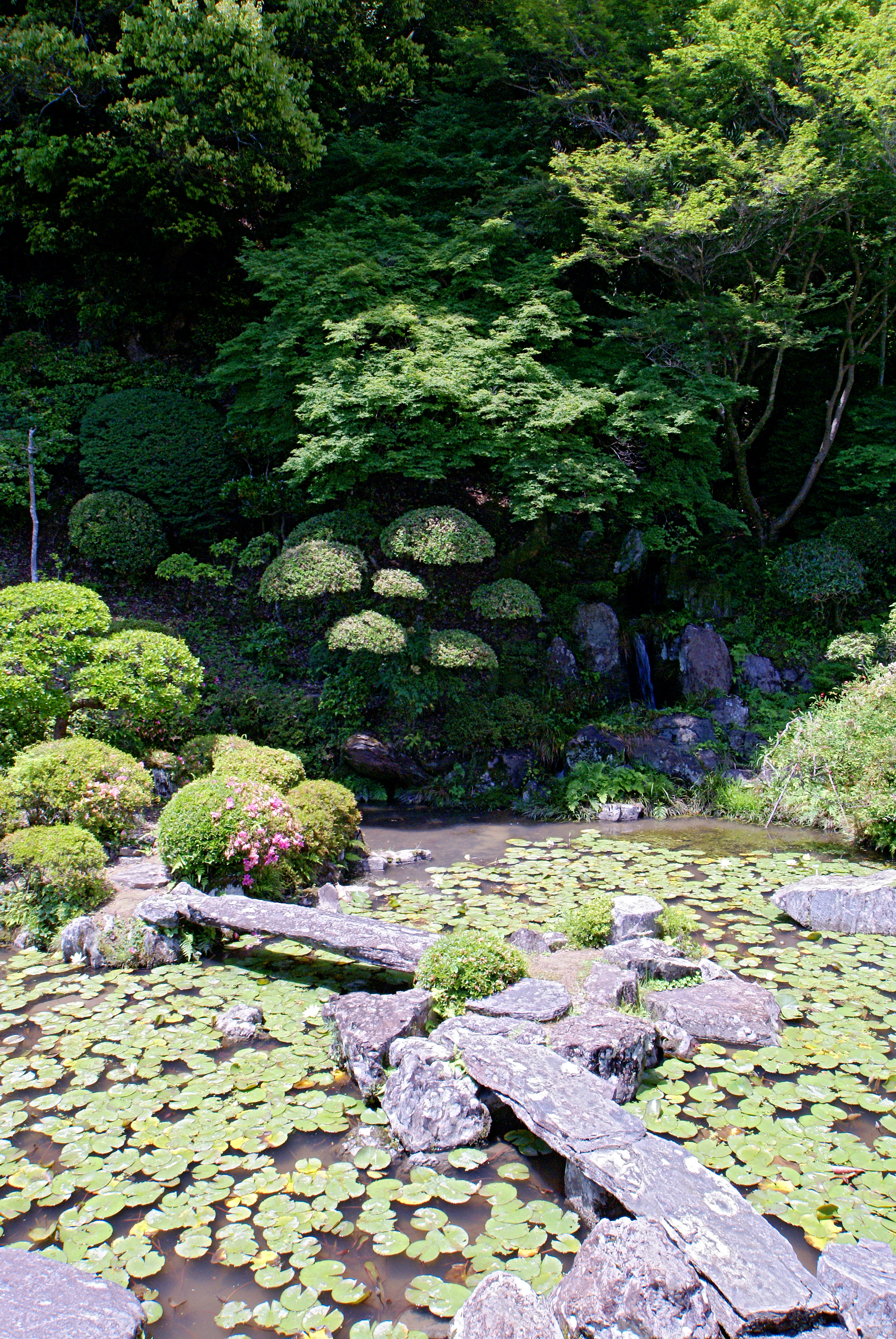
Gardens

== See also ==
- Siege of Negoro-ji
- List of Historic Sites of Japan (Wakayama)
- List of Places of Scenic Beauty of Japan (Wakayama)
- List of National Treasures of Japan (Temples)
- The 100 Views of Nature in Kansai
