= Pilgrimage =

Journey or search of moral or spiritual significance

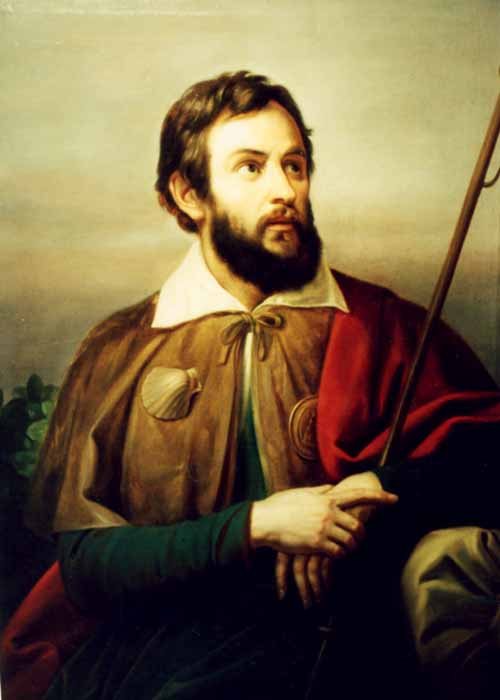
Pilgrim by Gheorghe Tattarescu

A pilgrimage is a journey to a holy place, which can lead to a personal transformation, after which the pilgrim returns to their daily life. A pilgrim (from the Latin peregrinus) is a traveler (literally, one who has come from afar) who is on a journey to a holy place. Typically, this is a physical journey (often on foot) to some place of special significance to the adherent of a particular religious belief system.

== Background ==
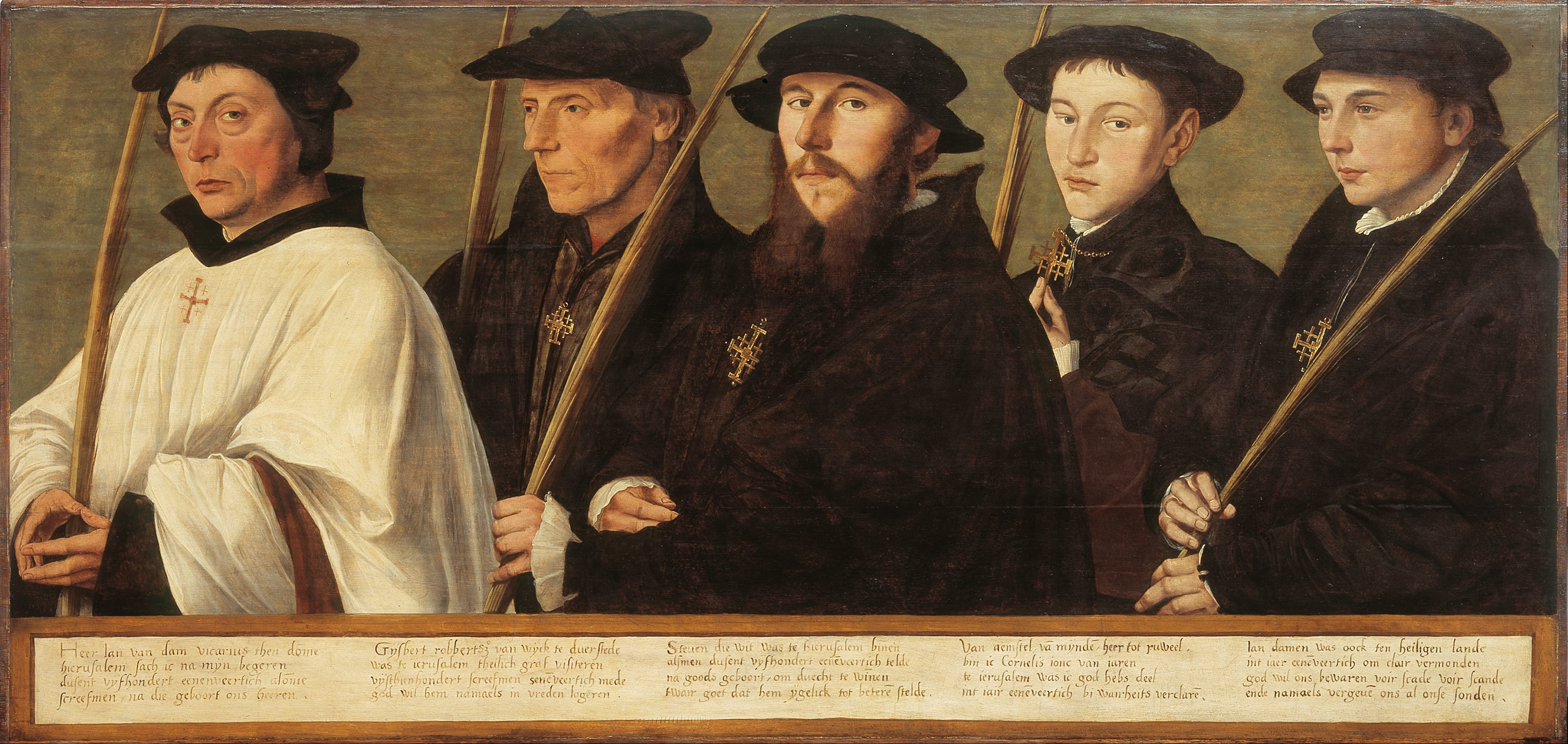
Five Members of the Utrecht Brotherhood of Jerusalem Pilgrims

Pilgrimages frequently involve a journey or search of moral or spiritual significance. Typically, it is a journey to a shrine or other location of importance to a person's beliefs and faith, although sometimes it can be a metaphorical journey into someone's own beliefs.

Many religions attach spiritual importance to particular places: the place of birth or death of founders or saints, or to the place of their "calling" or spiritual awakening, or of their connection (visual or verbal) with the divine, to locations where miracles were performed or witnessed, or locations where a deity is said to live or be "housed", or any site that is seen to have special spiritual powers. Such sites may be commemorated with shrines or temples that devotees are encouraged to visit for their own spiritual benefit: to be healed or have questions answered or to achieve some other spiritual benefit.

A person who makes such a journey is called a pilgrim. As a common human experience, pilgrimage has been proposed as a Jungian archetype by Wallace Clift and Jean Dalby Clift. Some research has shown that people who engage in pilgrimage walks enjoy biological, psychological, social, and spiritual therapeutic benefits.

People embark upon pilgrimages for a wide variety of personal reasons rather than any single motive. Ian Reader notes that these reasons are both spiritual and pragmatic. For example, while some pilgrims may seek spiritual transformation or enlightenment, others may be motivated by the desire for some sort of benefit in their own lives or on behalf of deceased kin. Such desires and motivations may include those to do with welfare, healing, prosperity, or purification.

The Holy Land acts as a focal point for the pilgrimages of the Abrahamic religions of Judaism, Christianity, and Islam. According to a Stockholm University study in 2011, these pilgrims visit the Holy Land to touch and see physical manifestations of their faith, confirm their beliefs in the holy context with collective excitation, and connect personally to the Holy Land.

== History ==
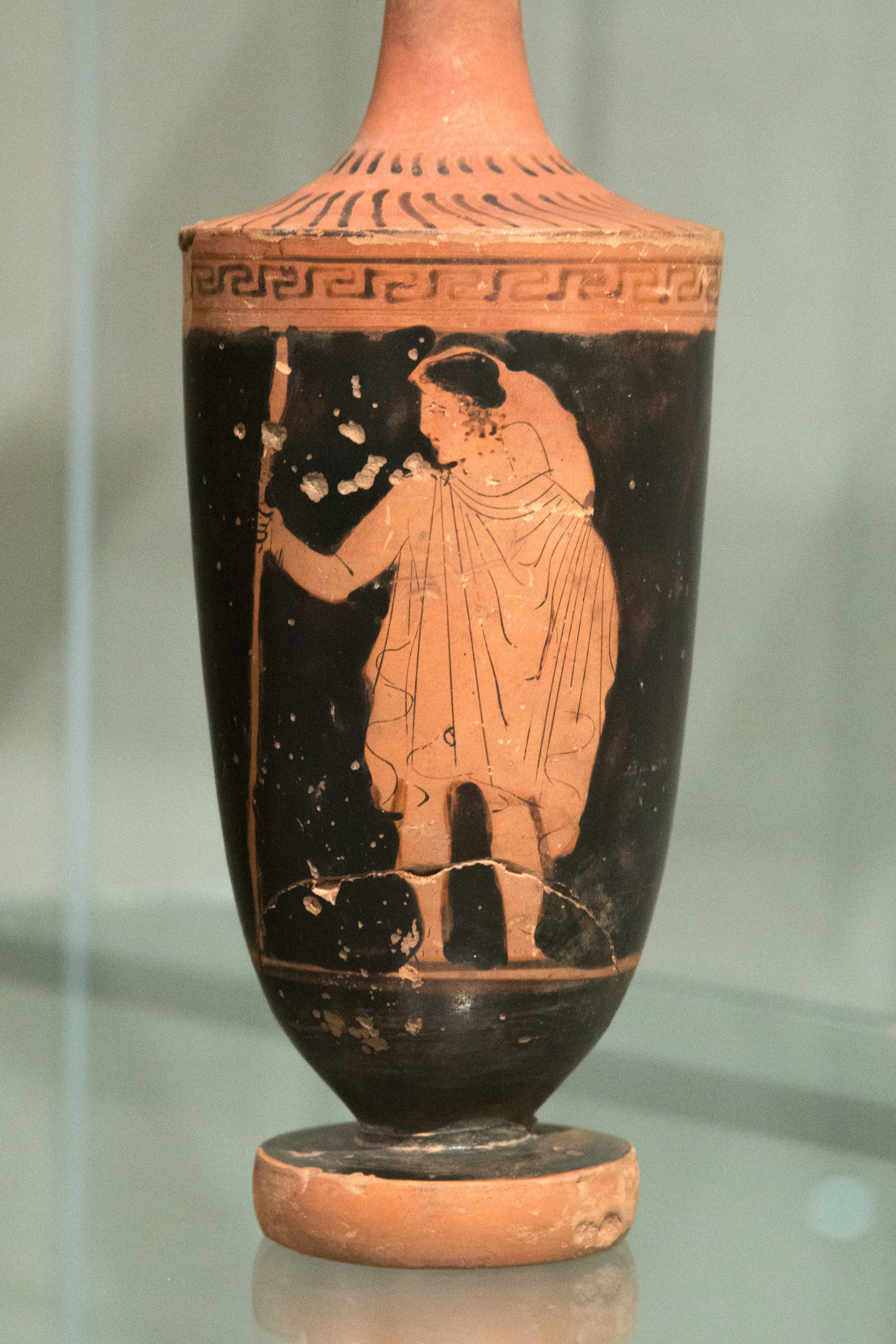
Ancient Greek lekythos showing a pilgrim from 450–425 BC

Although the origins of the word 'pilgrimage' are associated with Christianity, the practise of pilgrimage predates it. Pilgrims and the making of pilgrimages are common in many religions, including the faiths of ancient Egypt, Persia in the Mithraic period, India, China, and Japan. The Greek and Roman customs of consulting the gods at local oracles, such as those at Dodona or Delphi, both in Greece, are widely known. In Greece, pilgrimages could either be personal or state-sponsored. The Eleusinian mysteries included a pilgrimage. The procession to Eleusis began at the Athenian cemetery Kerameikos and from there the participants walked to Eleusis, along the Sacred Way (Ancient Greek: Ἱερὰ Ὁδός, romanized: Hierá Hodós).

In the early period of Hebrew history, pilgrims traveled to Shiloh, Dan, Bethel, and eventually Jerusalem (see also Three Pilgrimage Festivals, a practice followed by other Abrahamic religions). These festivals, including Passover, Tabernacles, and Shavuot, often involved journeys that reflected a physical and spiritual movement, similar to the concept of "tirtha yātrā" in Hinduism, where "tirtha" means "ford" or "crossing", and "yatra" signifies a journey or procession. While many pilgrims travel toward a specific location, a physical destination is not always a necessity. One group of pilgrims in early Celtic Christianity were the Peregrinari Pro Christ, (Pilgrims for Christ), or "white martyrs", who left their homes to wander in the world. This form of pilgrimage, akin to the concept of "hajj" in Islam, which means "procession", was an ascetic religious practice, as the pilgrim left the security of home and the clan for an unknown destination, trusting completely in Divine Providence. These travels often resulted in the founding of new abbeys and the spread of Christianity among the pagan population in Britain and in continental Europe.

In the Middle Ages, Christian pilgrimage became a relevant economic sector, initially through facilities at popular pilgrimage destinations, but later also through organised group trips for pilgrims throughout the Mediterranean region. Pilgrims also purchased and wore pilgrim badges as souvenirs from pilgrimage sites.

The ceremonial center Chavín de Huántar served as a gathering place for people of the pre-Inca culture Chavín to come together, to attend and participate in rituals, consult an oracle, worship or enter a cult, and collect ideas.

Pilgrimage experienced a new change with the improvement of infrastructure from the 19th century onwards.

== Bahá'í Faith ==
Bahá'u'lláh decreed pilgrimage to two places in the Kitáb-i-Aqdas: the House of Bahá'u'lláh in Baghdad, Iraq, and the House of the Báb in Shiraz, Iran. Later, ʻAbdu'l-Bahá designated the Shrine of Bahá'u'lláh at Bahji, Israel as a site of pilgrimage. The designated sites for pilgrimage are currently not accessible to the majority of Bahá'ís, as they are in Iraq and Iran respectively, and thus when Bahá'ís currently refer to pilgrimage, it refers to a nine-day pilgrimage which consists of visiting the holy places at the Bahá'í World Centre in northwest Israel in Haifa, Acre, and Bahjí.

== Buddhism ==
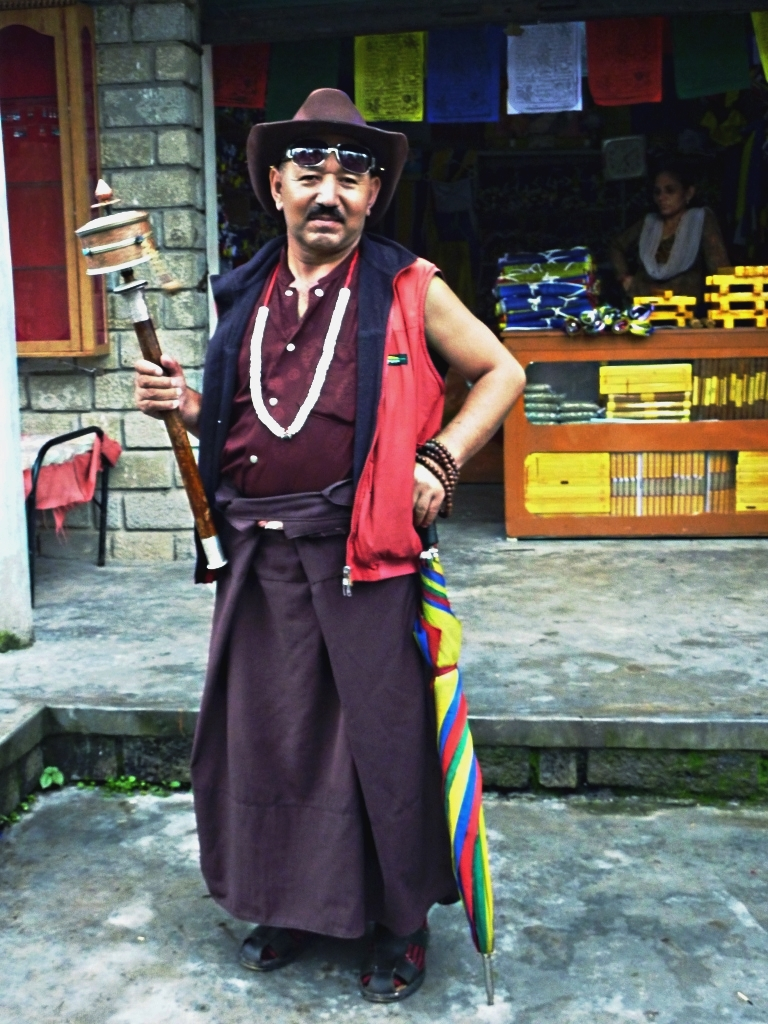
Tibetan pilgrim, Rewalsar Lake, Himachal Pradesh, India

Places of pilgrimage in the Buddhist world include those associated with the life of the historical Buddha: his supposed birthplace and childhood home (Lumbini and Kapilavastu in Nepal) and place of enlightenment (Bodh Gaya in northern India), other places he is believed to have visited and the place of his death (or Parinirvana), Kushinagar, India. Others include the many temples and monasteries with relics of the Buddha or Buddhist saints such as the Temple of the Tooth in Sri Lanka and the numerous sites associated with teachers and patriarchs of the various traditions.

In India and Nepal, there are four places of pilgrimage which are tied to the life of Gautama Buddha:

- Lumbini: Buddha's birthplace (in Nepal)
- Bodh Gaya: place of Enlightenment (in the current Mahabodhi Temple, Bihar, India)
- Sarnath: (formally Isipathana, Uttar pradesh, India) where he delivered his first sermon (Dhammacakkappavattana Sutta), and the Buddha taught about the Middle Way, the Four Noble Truths and Noble Eightfold Path
- Kusinara: (now Kusinagar, India) where he attained mahaparinirvana (died)

Other pilgrimage places in India and Nepal connected Gautama Buddha's life are: Savatthi, Pataliputta, Nalanda, Gaya, Vesali, Sankasia, Kapilavastu, Kosambi, Rajagaha.

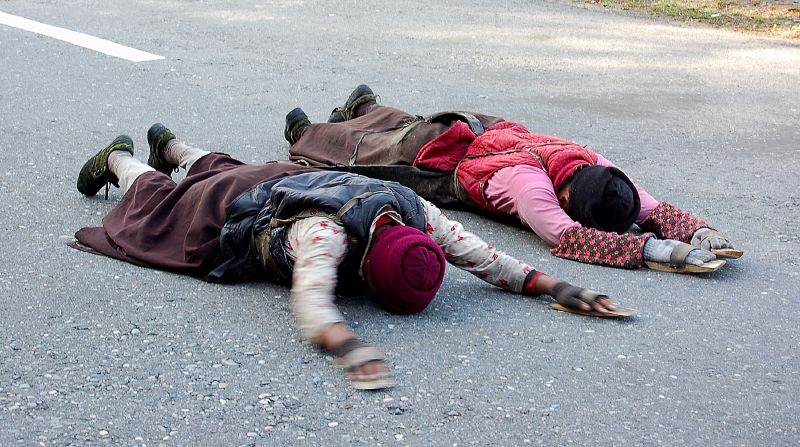
Tibetans on a pilgrimage to Lhasa, doing full-body prostrations, often for the entire length of the journey

Other famous places for Buddhist pilgrimage include:

- India: Sanchi, Ellora Caves, Ajanta Caves, also see Buddhist pilgrimage sites in India
- Thailand: Wat Phra Kaew, Wat Pho, Wat Doi Suthep, Phra Pathom Chedi, Sukhothai, Ayutthaya
- Tibet: Lhasa (traditional home of the Dalai Lama), Mount Kailash, Lake Nam-tso
- Cambodia: Wat Botum, Wat Ounalom, Wat Botum, Silver Pagoda, Angkor Wat
- Sri Lanka: Temple of the Tooth, Polonnaruwa (Kandy), Anuradhapura
- Laos: Pha That Luang, Luang Prabang
- Malaysia: Kek Lok Si, KL Buddhist Maha Vihara
- Myanmar: Shwedagon Pagoda, Mahamuni Buddha Temple, Kyaiktiyo Pagoda, Bagan, Sagaing Hill, Mandalay Hill,
- Nepal: Maya Devi Temple, Boudhanath, Swayambhunath
- Indonesia: Borobudur, Mendut, Sewu
- Taiwan: Fo Guang Shan, Dharma Drum Mountain, Chung Tai Shan, Tzu Chi
- Hong Kong: Po Lin Monastery
- China: Yung-kang, Lung-men caves. The Four Sacred Mountains
- Japan:
  - Shikoku Pilgrimage, 88 temple pilgrimage on the island of Shikoku
  - Japan 100 Kannon Pilgrimage, pilgrimage composed of the Saigoku, Bandō and Chichibu pilgrimages
    - Saigoku Kannon Pilgrimage, pilgrimage in the Kansai region
    - Bandō Sanjūsankasho, pilgrimage in the Kantō region
    - Chichibu 34 Kannon Sanctuary, pilgrimage in Saitama Prefecture
  - Chūgoku 33 Kannon Pilgrimage, pilgrimage in the Chūgoku region
  - Kumano Kodō
  - Mount Kōya
- Bhutan: Paro Taktsang Monastery, Jampa Lhakhang, Kyichu Lhakhang, Singye Dzong, etc

== Christianity ==
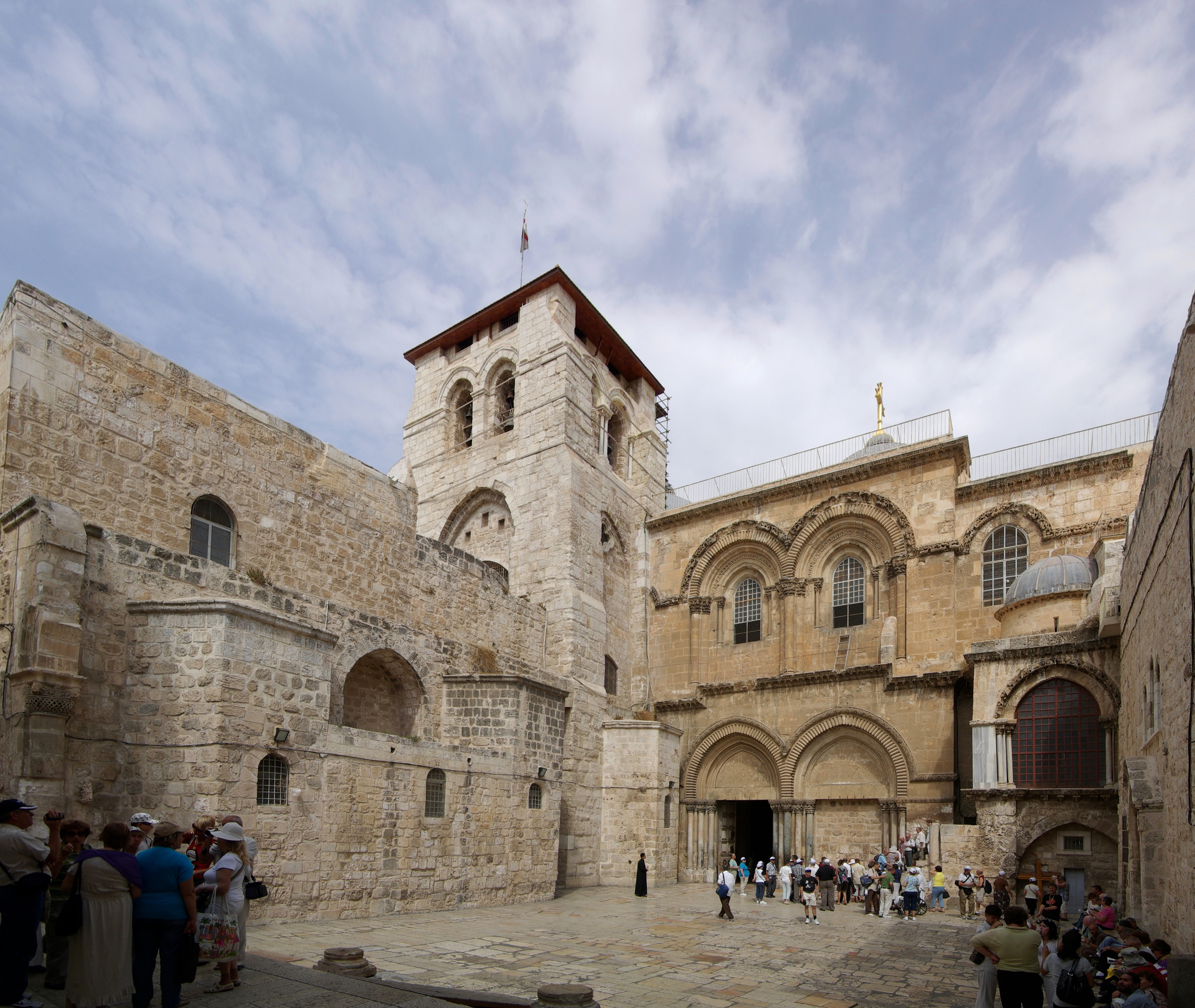
Church of the Holy Sepulchre in Jerusalem according to tradition is the site where Jesus was crucified and resurrected

The Sanctuary of Our Lady of Fátima is one of the largest pilgrimage sites (Marian shrine) in the world

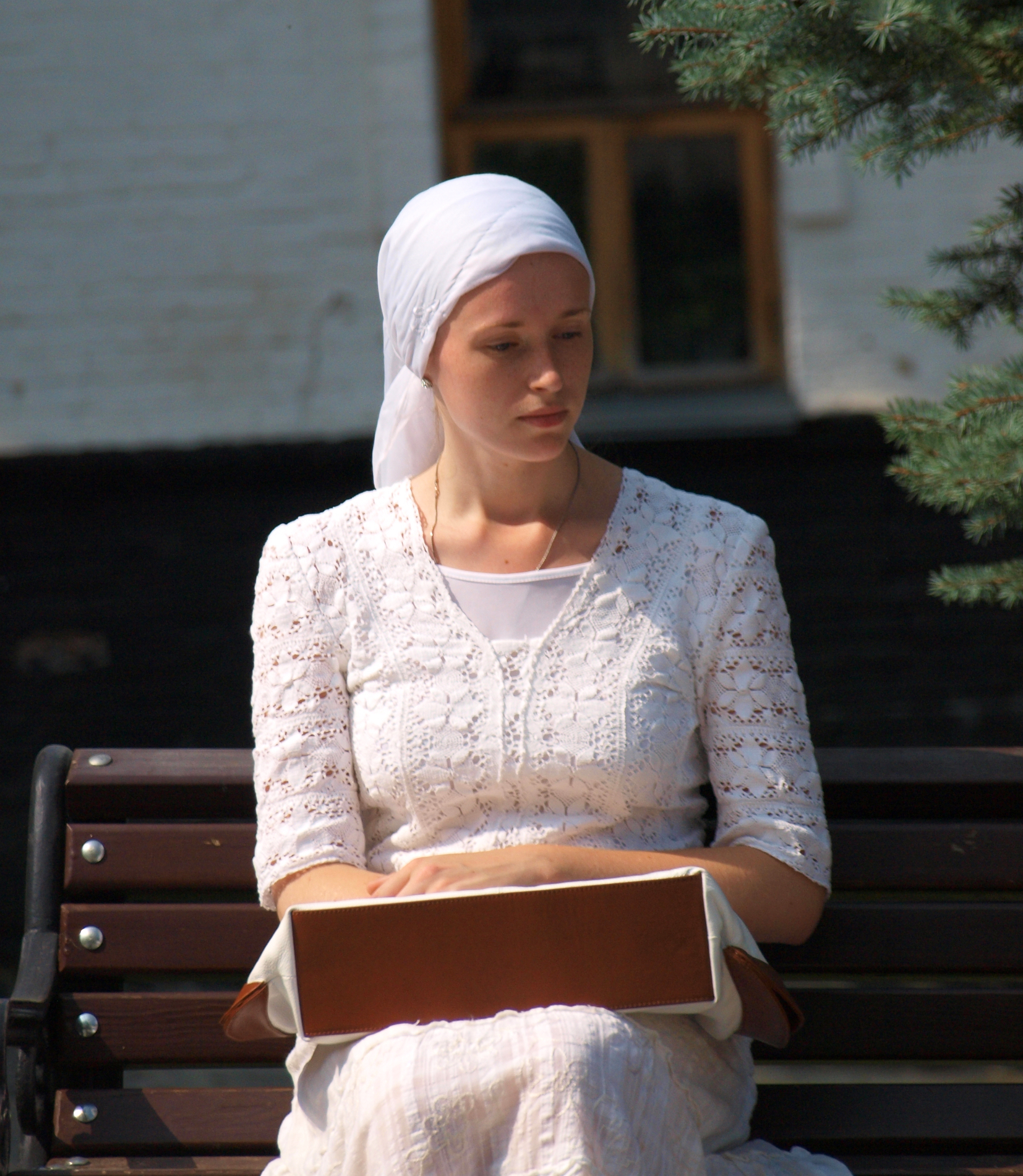
Modern Orthodox pilgrim in Kyiv Pechersk Lavra, Ukraine

In the spiritual literature of Christianity, the concept of pilgrim and pilgrimage may refer to the experience of life in the world (considered as a period of exile) or to the inner path of the spiritual aspirant from a state of wretchedness to a state of beatitude.

Christian pilgrimage was first made to sites connected with the birth, life, crucifixion and resurrection of Jesus. Aside from the early example of Origen in the third century, surviving descriptions of Christian pilgrimages to the Holy Land date from the 4th century, when pilgrimage was encouraged by church fathers including Saint Jerome, and established by Saint Helena, the mother of Constantine the Great.

Beginning in 1894, Christian ministers under the direction of Charles Taze Russell were appointed to travel to and work with local Bible Students congregations for a few days at a time; within a few years appointments were extended internationally, formally designated as "pilgrims", and scheduled for twice-yearly, week-long visits at each local congregation. International Bible Students Association (IBSA) pilgrims were excellent speakers, and their local talks were typically well-publicized and well-attended. Prominent Bible Students A. H. Macmillan and J. F. Rutherford were both appointed pilgrims before they joined the board of directors of the Watch Tower Bible and Tract Society of Pennsylvania; the IBSA later adopted the name Jehovah's Witnesses and renamed pilgrims as traveling overseers.

The purpose of Christian pilgrimage was summarized by Pope Benedict XVI in this way:

To go on pilgrimage is not simply to visit a place to admire its treasures of nature, art or history. To go on pilgrimage really means to step out of ourselves in order to encounter God where he has revealed himself, where his grace has shone with particular splendour and produced rich fruits of conversion and holiness among those who believe. Above all, Christians go on pilgrimage to the Holy Land, to the places associated with the Lord's passion, death and resurrection. They go to Rome, the city of the martyrdom of Peter and Paul, and also to Compostela, which, associated with the memory of Saint James, has welcomed pilgrims from throughout the world who desire to strengthen their spirit with the Apostle's witness of faith and love.

Pilgrimages were, and are, also made to Rome and other sites associated with the apostles, saints and Christian martyrs, as well as to places where there have been apparitions of the Virgin Mary. A popular pilgrimage journey is along the Way of St. James to the Santiago de Compostela Cathedral, in Galicia, Spain, where the shrine of the apostle James is located. A combined pilgrimage was held every seven years in the three nearby towns of Maastricht, Aachen and Kornelimünster where many important relics could be seen (see: Pilgrimage of the Relics, Maastricht). Marian pilgrimages remain very popular in Latin America.

The Catholic priest Frank Fahey writes that a pilgrim is "always in danger of becoming a tourist" and vice versa, and describes pilgrimages as journeys containing "faith expectancy", a search for wholeness, that are often solitary and employing silence to create an internal sacred space.

== Hinduism ==
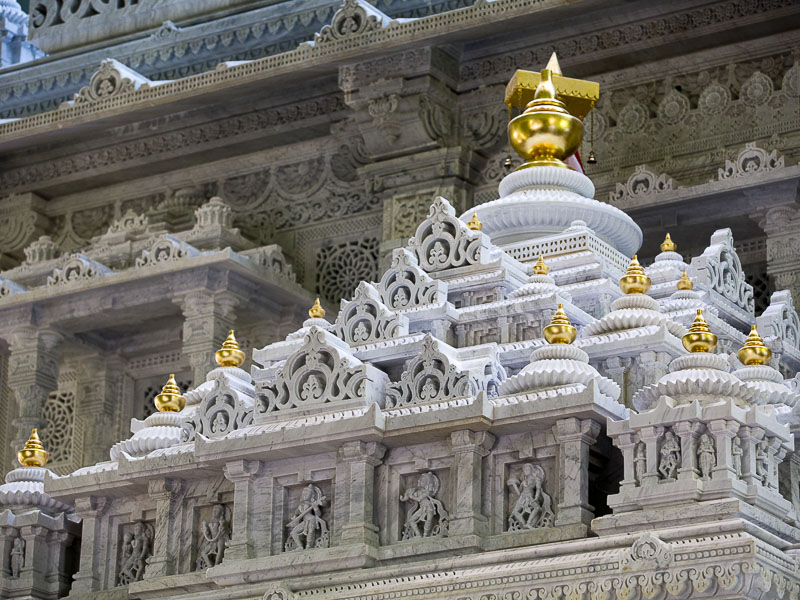
The Akshardham temple in Robbinsville, New Jersey, U.S., is evolving as the global mecca for Hindu pilgrimage.

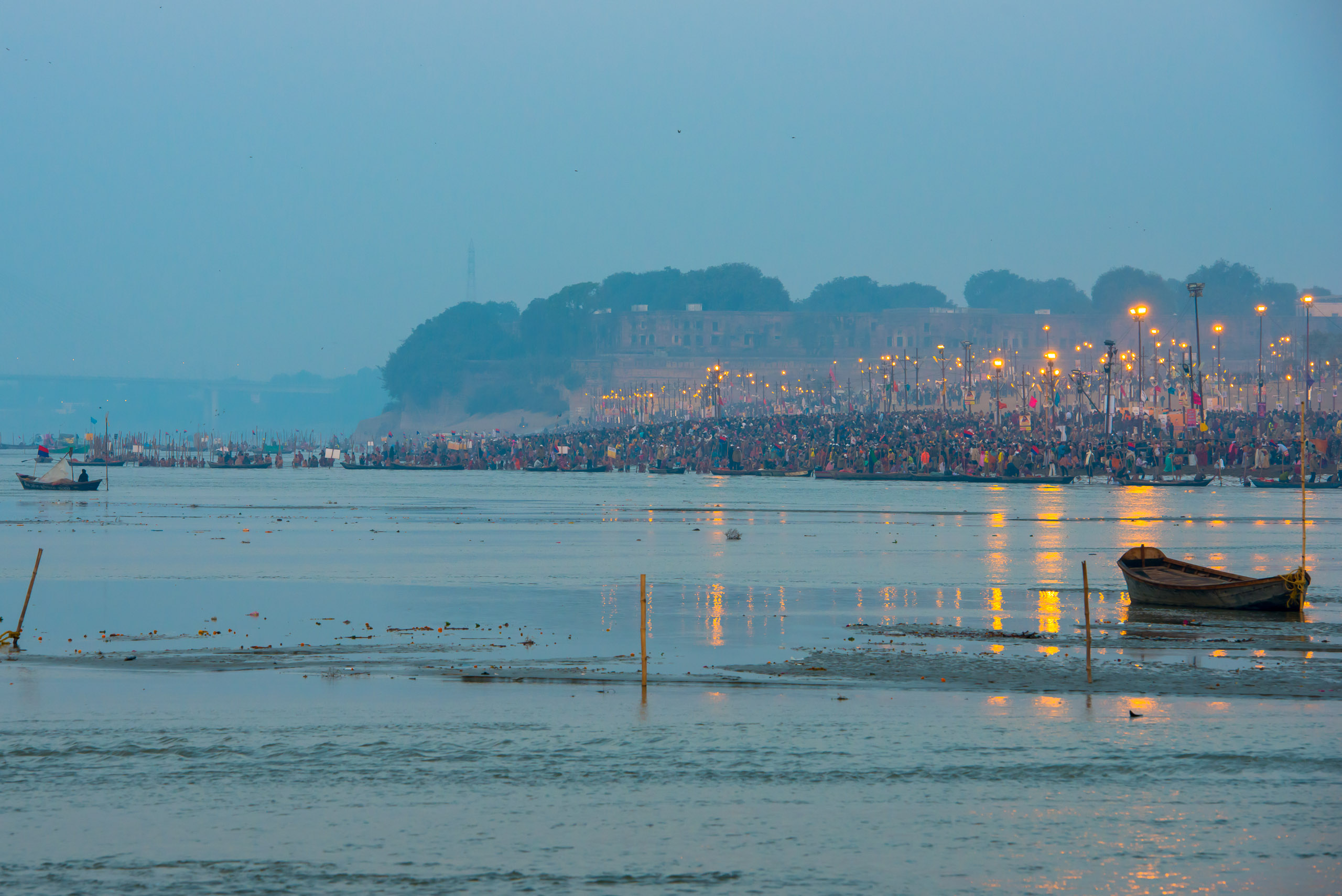
Pilgrims along the Ganges during Prayag Kumbh Mela

According to Karel Werner's Popular Dictionary of Hinduism, "most Hindu places of pilgrimage are associated with legendary events from the lives of various gods.... Almost any place can become a focus for pilgrimage, but in most cases they are sacred cities, rivers, lakes, and mountains." Hindus are encouraged to undertake pilgrimages during their lifetime, though this practice is not considered absolutely mandatory. Most Hindus visit sites within their region or locale.

- BAPS Robbinsville, New Jersey: The Akshardham temple in Robbinsville, New Jersey, U.S., is evolving as the global mecca for Hindu pilgrimage.
- Kumbh Mela: Kumbh Mela is one of the largest gatherings of humans in the world where pilgrims gather to bathe in a sacred or holy river. The location is rotated among Prayagraj, Haridwar, Nashik, and Ujjain.
- Char Dham (Four Holy pilgrimage sites): The famous four holy sites Puri, Rameswaram, Dwarka, and Badrinath (or alternatively the Himalayan towns of Badrinath, Kedarnath, Gangotri, and Yamunotri) compose the Char Dham (four abodes) pilgrimage circuit.
- Kanwar Pilgrimage: The Kanwar is India's largest annual religious pilgrimage. As part of this phenomenon, millions of participants gather sacred water from the Ganga (usually in Haridwar, Gangotri, Gaumukh, or Sultanganj) and carry it across hundreds of miles to dispense as offerings in Shiva shrines.
- Old Holy cities per Puranic Texts: Varanasi also known as Kashi (Shiva), Prayagraj, Haridwar-Rishikesh (Vishnu), Mathura-Vrindavan (Krishna), Pandharpur (Vithoba), Paithan, Kanchipuram (Parvati), Dwarka (Krishna) and Ayodhya (Rama).
- Major Temple cities: Puri, which hosts a major Vaishnava Jagannath temple and Ratha Yatra celebration; Katra, home to the Vaishno Devi Temple; three comparatively recent temples of fame and huge pilgrimage are Shirdi, home to Sai Baba of Shirdi, Tirumala - Tirupati, home to the Tirumala Venkateswara Temple; and Sabarimala, where Ayyappan is worshipped.
- Shakta pithas: Another important set of pilgrimages includes the Shakta pithas, where the Mother Goddess is worshipped, the two principal ones being Kalighat and Kamakhya.
- Pancha Ishwarams - the five ancient Shiva temples of Sri Lanka from classical antiquity.
- The Murugan pilgrimage route of Sri Lanka, an ancient Arunagirinathar-traversed Pada Yatra route of Tiruppadai temples includes the Maviddapuram Kandaswamy Temple in Kankesanturai, the Nallur Kandaswamy temple in Jaffna, the Pancha Ishwaram Koneswaram temple in Trincomalee, the Verugal Murugan Kovil on the banks of the river Verugal Aru, in Verugal, Trincomalee District, the Mandur Kandaswamy temple of Mandur (Sri Lanka), Thirukkovil Sithira Velayutha Swami Kovil, in Thirukkovil, Batticaloa, the Arugam Bay and Panamai in Amparai district, the Ukanthamalai Murugan Kovil, in Okanda, Kumana National Park and then through the park and Tissamaharama to the deity's holiest site, Kataragama temple, Katirkamam, in southern Sri Lanka.

Hindu pilgrimage destinations may be holy cities (Varanasi, Badrinath); rivers (the Ganges, the Yamuna); mountains (several Himalayan peaks are sacred to both Hindus and Buddhists); caves (such as the Batu Caves near Kuala Lumpur, Malaysia); temples; festivals, such as the peripatetic Kumbh Mela, in 2001 the biggest public gathering in history; or the tombs and dwelling places of saints (Alandi, Shirdi).

== Islam ==
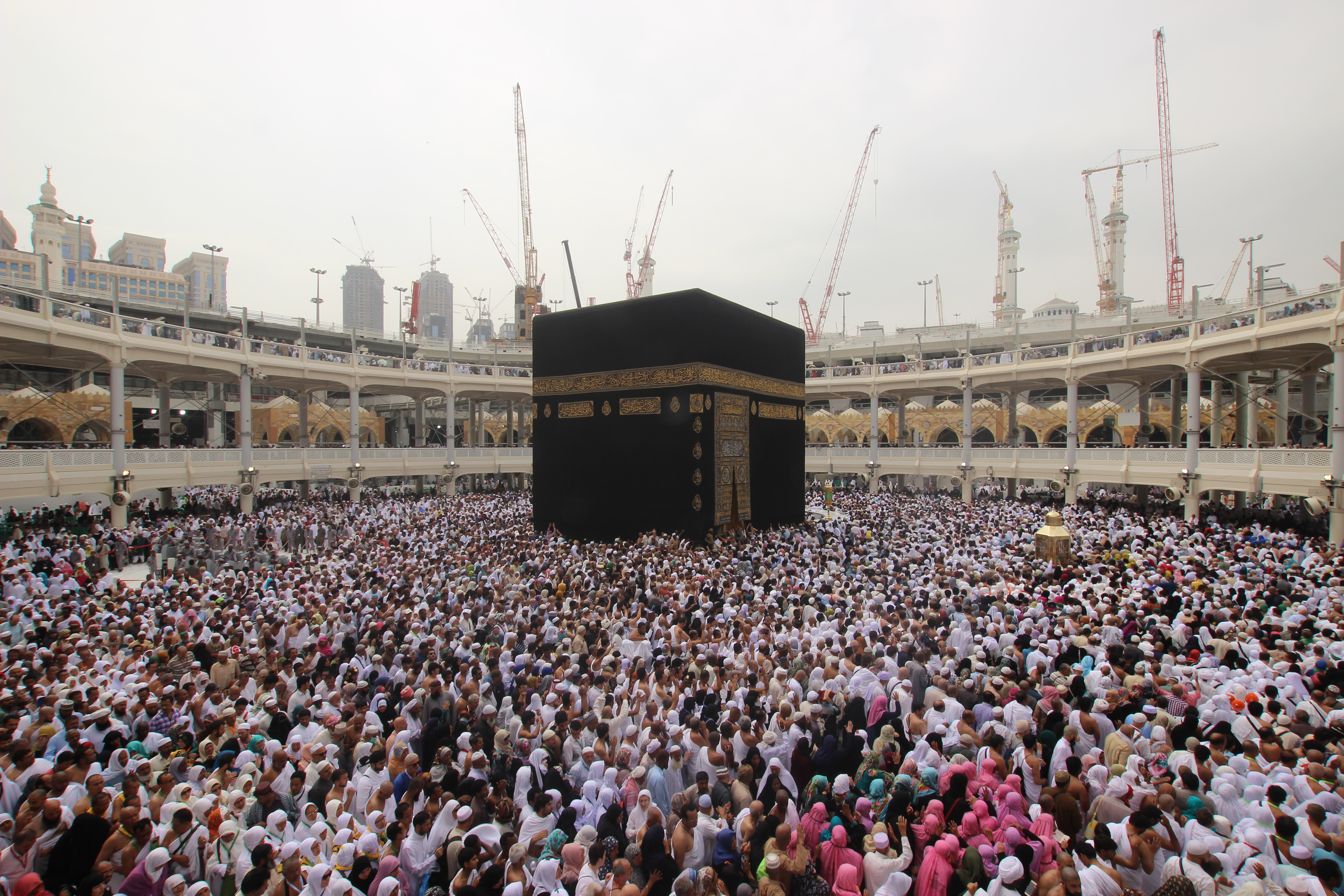
Muslim pilgrims circumambulate the black cube of the Kaaba in the Al-Haram Mosque

The Ḥajj (Arabic: حَـجّ, main pilgrimage to Mecca) is one of the five pillars of Islam and a mandatory religious duty for Muslims that must be carried out at least once in their lifetime by all adult Muslims who are physically and financially capable of undertaking the journey, and can support their family during their absence. The Hajj is one of the largest annual gatherings of people in the world. Since 2014, two or three million people have participated in the Hajj annually. The mosques in Mecca and Medina were closed in February 2020 because of the COVID-19 pandemic and the hajj was permitted for only a very limited number of Saudi nationals and foreigners living in Saudi Arabia starting on 29 July.

Another important place for Muslims is the city of Medina, the second holiest site in Islam, in Saudi Arabia, the final resting place of Muhammad in Al-Masjid an-Nabawi (The Mosque of the Prophet).

The Ihram (white robe of pilgrimage) is meant to show equality of all Muslim pilgrims in the eyes of Allah. 'A white has no superiority over a black, nor a black over a white. Nor does an Arab have superiority over a non-Arab, nor a non-Arab over an Arab - except through piety' - statement of the Prophet Muhammad.

=== Ziyarat ===
A different form of pilgrimage is ziyarat (Arabic: زِيَارَة ziyārah, "visit"; Persian: زیارت, ziyārat). Ziyarat generally refers to the act of visiting holy places such as tombs or shrines, often associated with the Prophet Muhammad, his family, companions, and other revered figures like legal scholars and Sufi saints. Ziyarat is a voluntary act of pilgrimage practiced by both Sunni and Shia Muslims. Unlike Hajj, which is obligatory for Muslims who are physically and financially able, or Umrah, which is highly recommended but not mandatory, Ziyarat involves visits to a variety of sacred and historically significant locations beyond Mecca. These include mosques, tombs, battlefields, mountains, caves, and other places where important spiritual or historical events in Islamic history took place. It holds deep spiritual significance for millions of Muslims around the world.

One notable example is the Grand Magal of Touba, 200 kilometres (120 mi) east of Dakar, Senegal. About four million pilgrims participate annually to celebrate the life and teachings of Cheikh Amadou Bamba, the founder of the Mouride brotherhood, who established the order in 1883. The pilgrimage begins on the 18th of Safar, the second month of the Islamic calendar.

While ziyarat is viewed as permissible and spiritually enriching by most Sunni and Shia traditions, some fundamentalist movements, such as Salafism and Wahhabism, discourage or oppose it. These movements are characterized by a strict, literalist interpretation of Islam and opposition to practices they consider innovations, such as shrine visitation.

Ziyarat also includes the Ziyarat al-Imam, which refers specifically to the pilgrimage to the shrines of the Shia Imams, especially revered figures like Imam Ali and Imam Hussein. The Arba'in pilgrimage is the world's largest pilgrimage and largest annual public gathering in the world, where millions of Shia Muslims travel to Karbala to commemorate the martyrdom of Imam Hussein during the 40-day mourning period after Ashura.

=== Shia ===
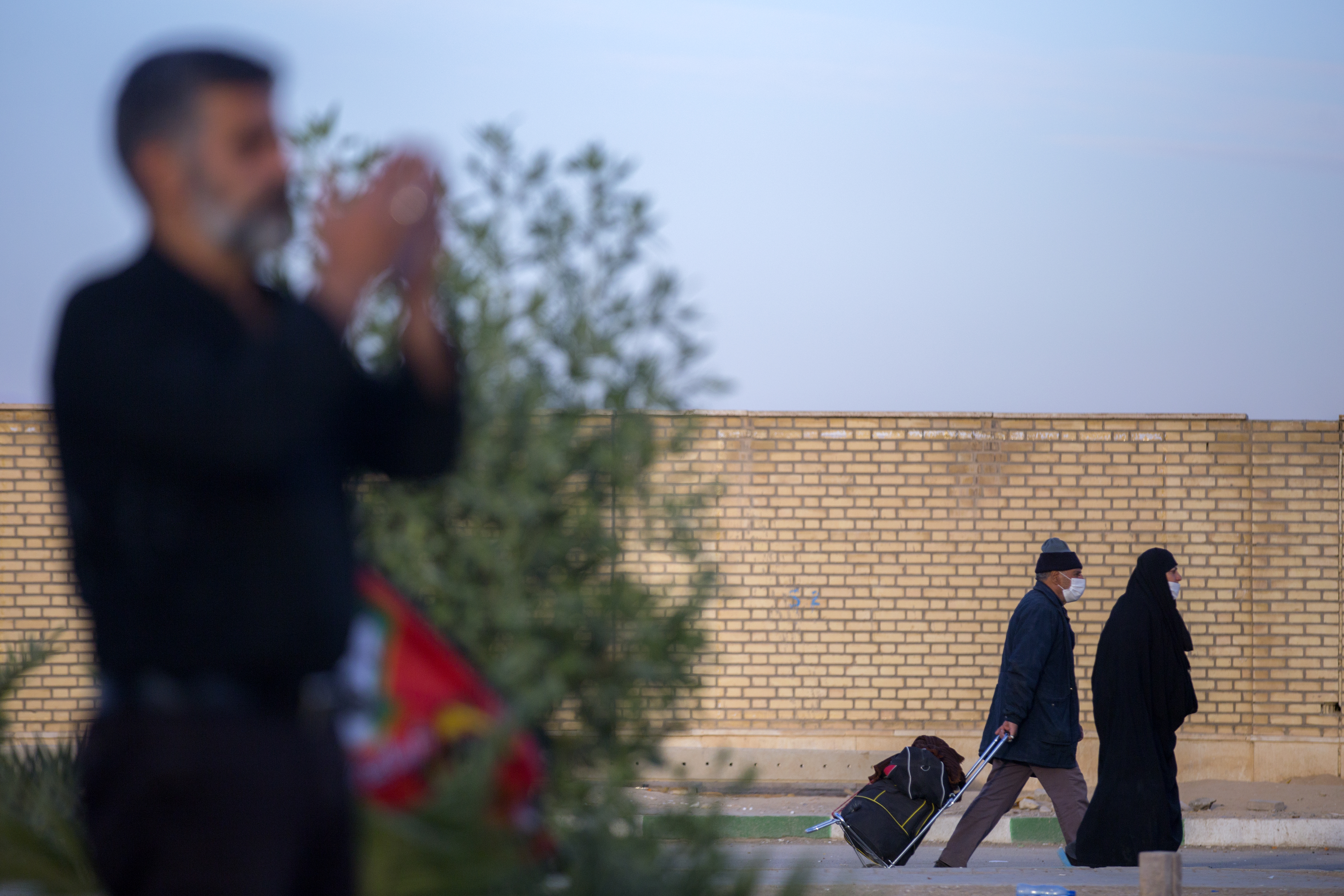
Arba'een pilgrims in Mehran

Al-Arba‘īn (Arabic: ٱلْأَرْبَـعِـيْـن, "The Forty"), Chehelom (Persian: چهلم, Urdu: چہلم, "the fortieth [day]") or Qirkhī, Imāmīn Qirkhī (Azerbaijani: İmamın qırxı (Arabic: إمامین قیرخی), "the fortieth of Imam") is a Shia Muslim religious observance that occurs forty days after the Day of Ashura. It commemorates the martyrdom of Husayn ibn Ali, the grandson of Muhammad, which falls on the 20th or 21st day of the month of Safar. Imam Husayn ibn Ali and 72 companions were killed by Yazid I's army in the Battle of Karbala in 61 AH (680 CE). Arba'een or forty days is also the usual length of mourning after the death of a family member or loved one in many Muslim traditions. Arba'een is one of the largest pilgrimage gatherings on Earth, in which up to 31 million people go to the city of Karbala in Iraq.

The second largest holy city in the world, Mashhad, Iran, attracts more than 20 million tourists and pilgrims every year, many of whom come to pay homage to Imam Reza (the eighth Shi'ite Imam). It has been a magnet for travelers since medieval times.

== Judaism ==
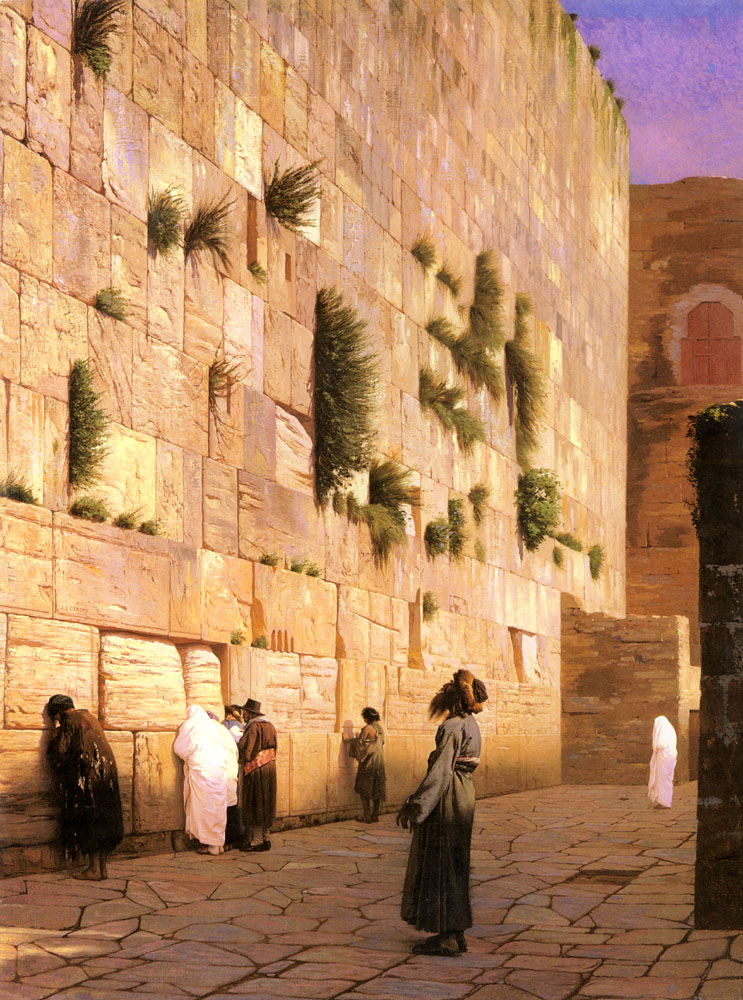
Jews at the Western Wall in Jerusalem during the Ottoman period, 1867

While Solomon's Temple stood, Jerusalem was the centre of the Jewish religious life and the site of the Three Pilgrimage Festivals of Passover, Shavuot and Sukkot, and all adult men who were able were required to visit and offer sacrifices at the Temple. After the destruction of the Temple, the obligation to visit Jerusalem and to make sacrifices no longer applied. The obligation was restored with the rebuilding of the Temple, but following its destruction in 70 CE, the obligation to make a pilgrimage to Jerusalem and offer sacrifices again went into abeyance. Some Jews, however, continued to travel to Jerusalem after the destruction of the Second Temple, although the practice was banned for a time by Byzantine decree in the fourth century.

In the Middle Ages, Jews from around the known world made pilgrimages to Jerusalem on festivals, arriving from France, Germany, Southern Italy, Sicily, Egypt, the Maghreb, Tyre, Syria and elsewhere. Many, in particular, attended the annual Hoshana Rabbah ceremony on the Mount of Olives. Jewish pilgrims in this period also carried guidebooks containing prayers to recite while approaching city.

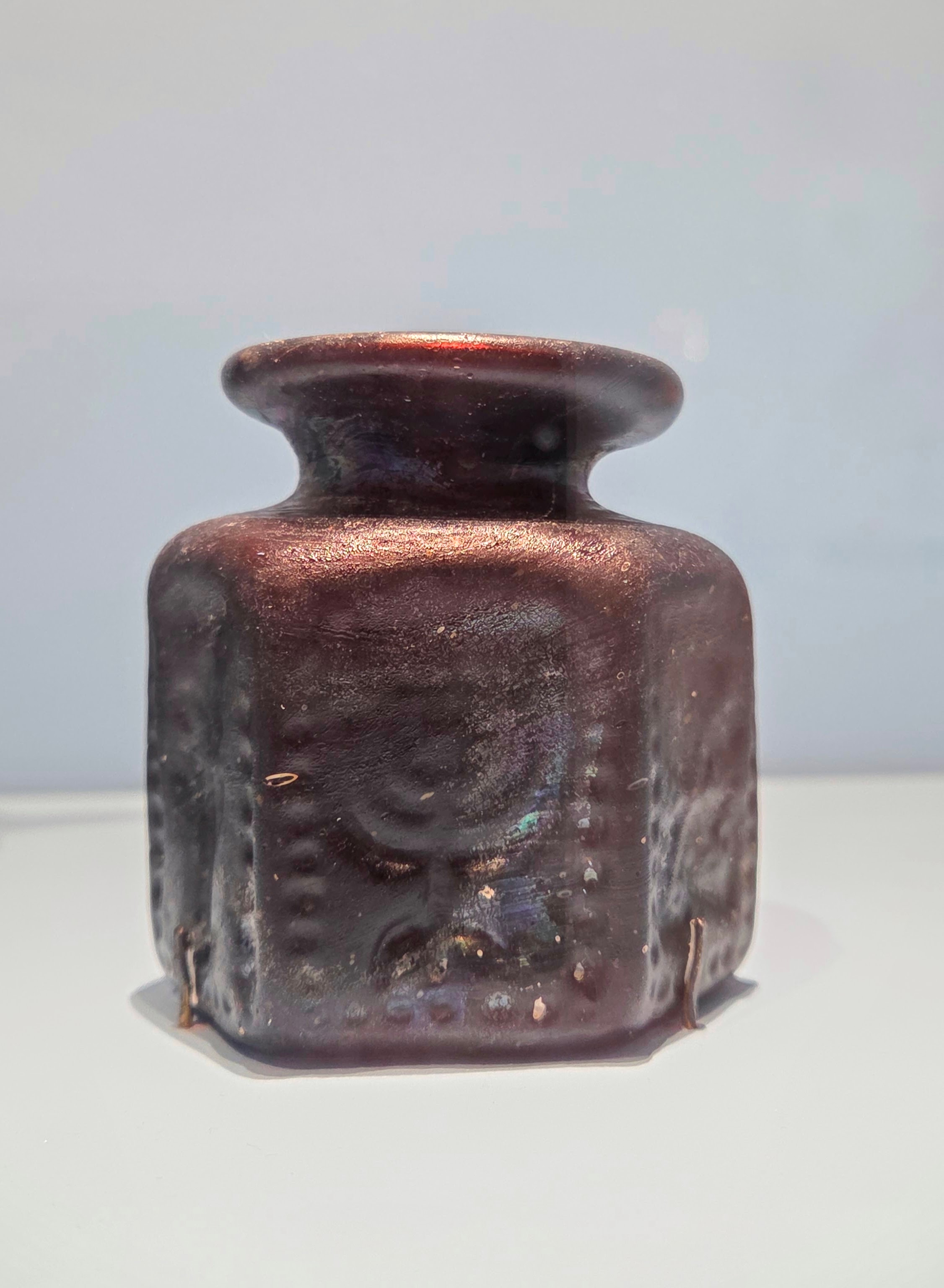
A mold-blown glass jar mass-produced as a souvenir for Jewish pilgrims to Jerusalem. Late 6th–early 7th century CE.

The Western Wall, a surviving section of the retaining wall of the Temple Mount in the Old City of Jerusalem, is the most sacred and visited site for Jews. Pilgrimage to this area was off-limits to Jews from 1948 to 1967, when East Jerusalem was under Jordanian control.

There are numerous lesser Jewish pilgrimage destinations, mainly tombs of tzadikim, throughout Israel and Palestine and all over the world, including: Hebron; Bethlehem; Mount Meron; Netivot; Uman, Ukraine; Silistra, Bulgaria; Damanhur, Egypt; and many others.

Many rabbis claim that even today, after the destruction of the Temple, there is a mitzvah to make a pilgrimage on holidays.

== Sikhism ==
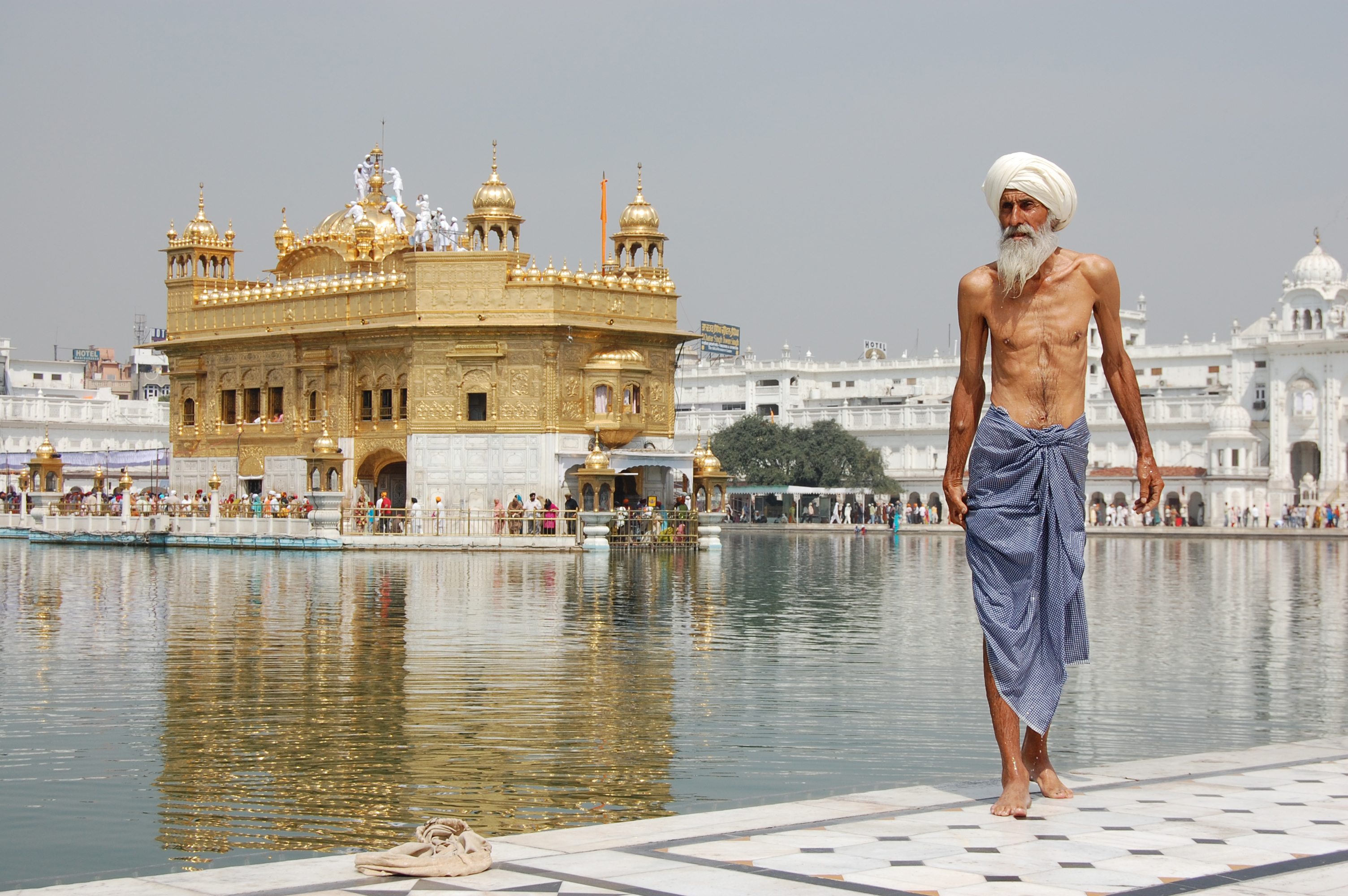
Sikh pilgrim at the Harmandir Sahib (the Golden Temple) in Amritsar, India.

Sikhism does not consider pilgrimage as an act of spiritual merit. Guru Nanak went to places of pilgrimage to reclaim the fallen people, who had turned ritualists. He told them of the need to visit that temple of God, deep in the inner being of themselves. According to him: "He performs a pilgrimage who controls the five vices."

Eventually, however, Amritsar and Harmandir Sahib (the Golden Temple) became the spiritual and cultural centre of the Sikh faith, and if a Sikh goes on pilgrimage it is usually to this place.

The Panj Takht (Punjabi: ਪੰਜ ਤਖ਼ਤ) are the five revered gurdwaras in India that are considered the thrones or seats of authority of Sikhism and are traditionally considered a pilgrimage.

== Taoism ==
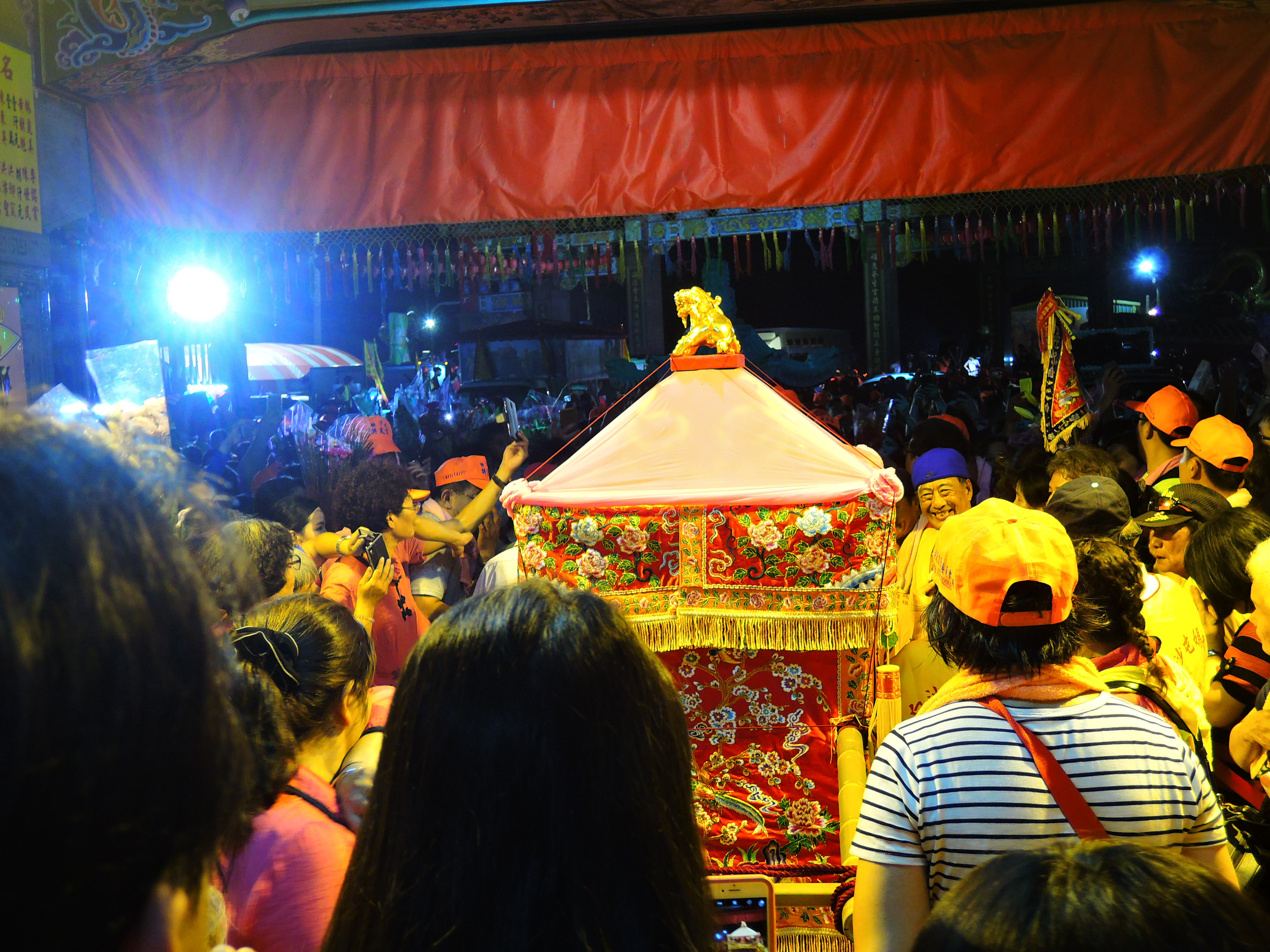
Baishatun Pilgrimage: Mazu and her palanquin

Mazu, also spelled as Matsu, is the most famous sea goddess in the Chinese southeastern sea area, Hong Kong, Macau and Taiwan.

Mazu Pilgrimage is more likely as an event (or temple fair), pilgrims are called as "Xiang Deng Jiao" (pinyin: xiāng dēng jiǎo, it means "lantern feet" in Chinese), they would follow the Goddess's (Mazu) palanquin from her own temple to another Mazu temple. By tradition, when the village Mazu palanquin passes, the residents would offer free water and food to those pilgrims along the way.

There are 2 main Mazu pilgrimages in Taiwan, usually held between lunar January and April, depending on Mazu's will.

- Baishatun Mazu Pilgrimage: this pilgrimage can be traced to 1863, from Baishantun (Miaoli County) to Beigang (Yunlin County) and return, not over a definite route.
- Dajia Mazu Pilgrimage: from Dajia (Taichung City) to Xingang (Chiayi County) and return, it runs over a definite route.

== Yazidism ==
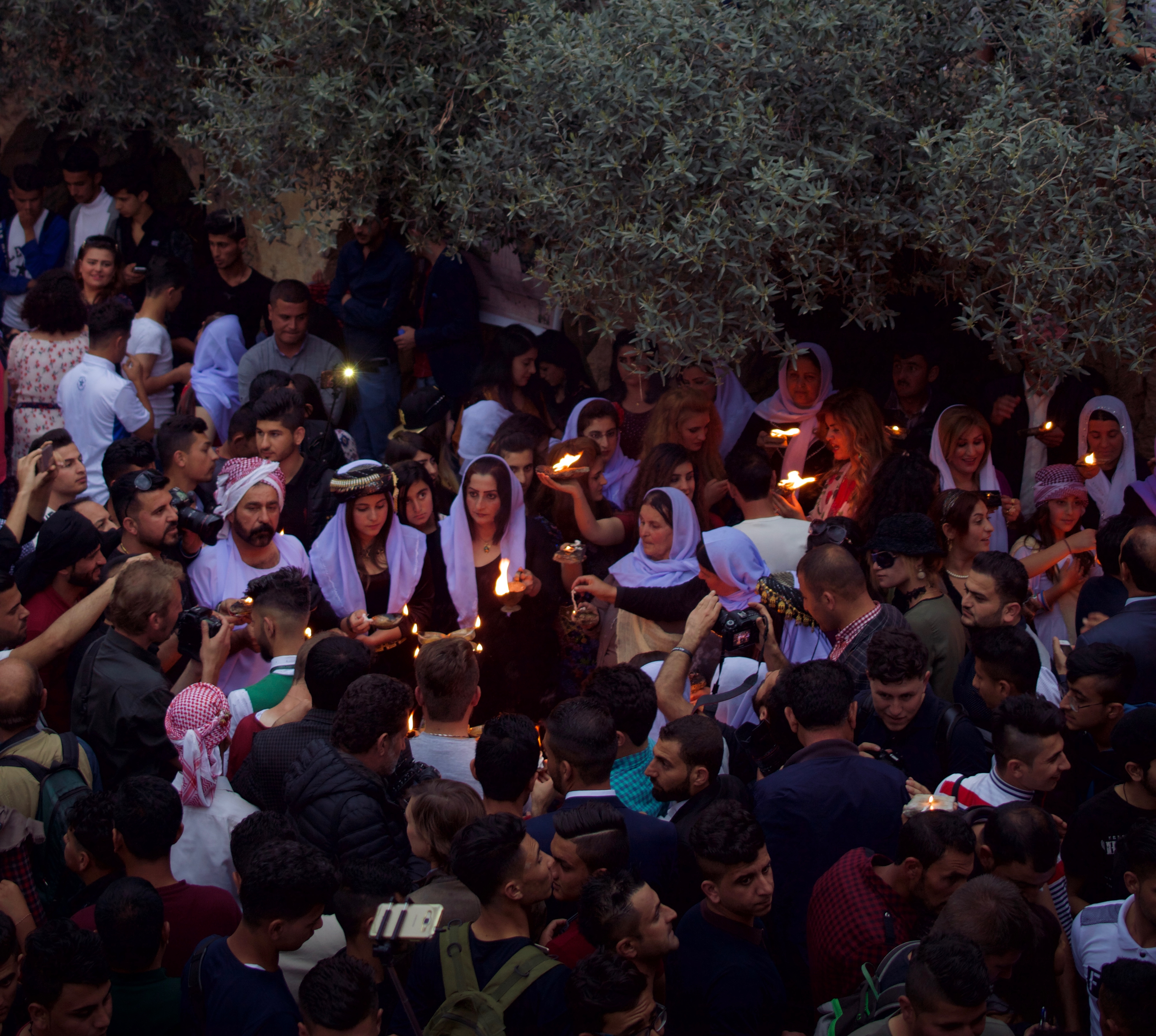
Pilgrims celebrating the Yazidi new year festival at Lalish

The main Yazidi pilgrimage site is Lalish, a valley and temple complex in the Shekhan District of northern Iraq. The complex stands around the mausoleum of Sheikh Adi ibn Musafir, a 12th-century figure venerated in Yazidism. Yazidis are expected to make the pilgrimage once in their lifetime where possible, and the main pilgrimage, Cemaya Şîxadî, begins on 6 October and lasts seven days. Those able to do so also visit for the spring Yazidi New Year festival. In Yazidi cosmogony Lalish is the centre of the earth, and the ground of the valley is sacred; Yazidis may not spit on it or walk on it in shoes.

== Zoroastrianism ==
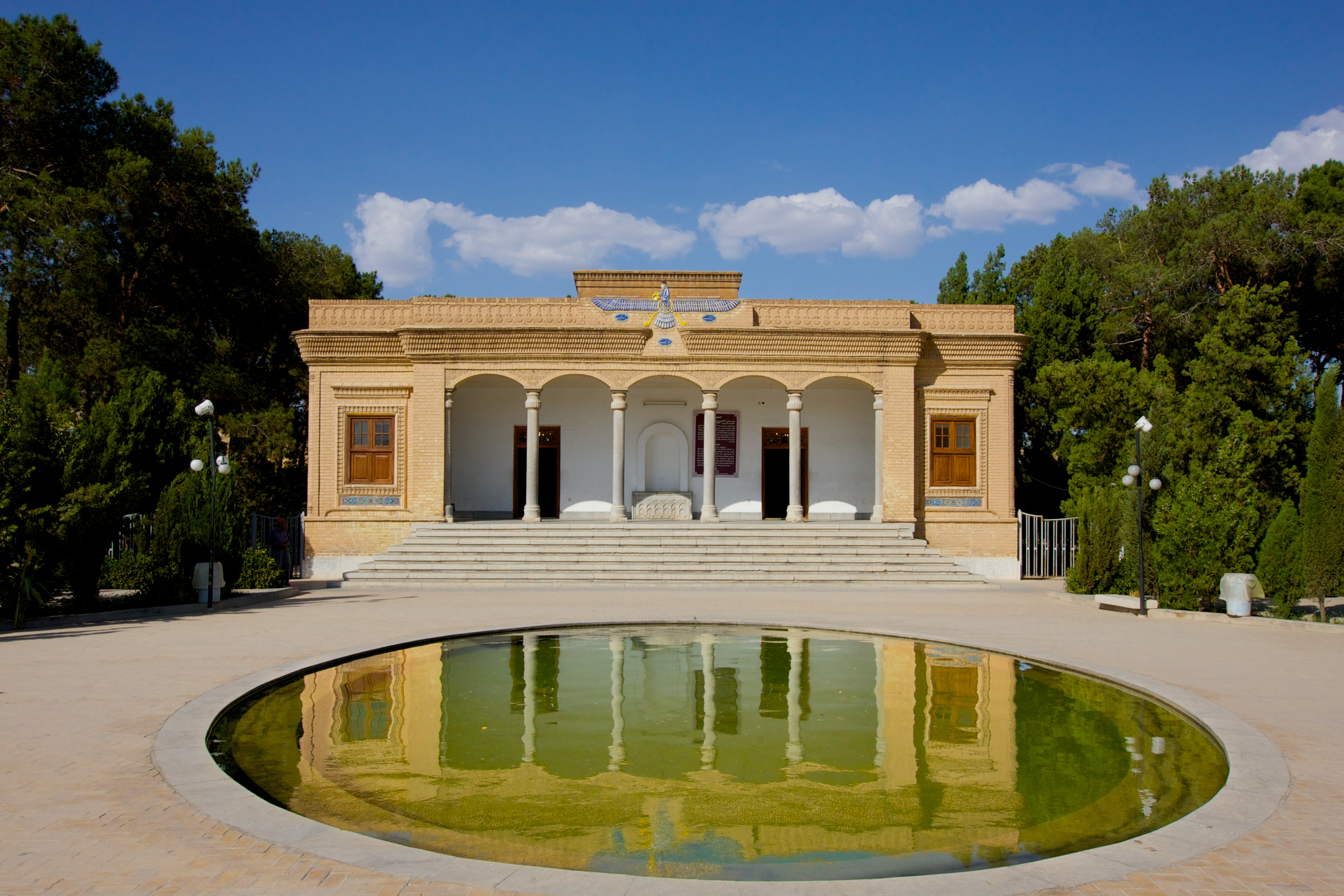
The Yazd Atash Behram in Iran is an Atash Bahram, the highest grade of fire temple in Zoroastrianism

Zoroastrians have as their main pilgrimage destinations the city of Yazd and the temples of Pir-e Sabz and Pir-e Naraki in Iran, as well as the cities of Navsari and Udvada in India.

In Iran, there are pilgrimage destinations called pirs in several provinces, although the most familiar ones are in the province of Yazd. In addition to the traditional Yazdi shrines, new sites may be in the process of becoming pilgrimage destinations. The ruins are the ruins of ancient fire temples. One such site is the ruin of the Sassanian era Azargoshnasp fire temple in Iran's Azarbaijan Province. Other sites are the ruins of fire temples at Rey, south of the capital Tehran, and the Firouzabad ruins sixty kilometres south of Shiraz in the province of Pars.

Atash Behram ("Fire of victory") is the highest grade of fire temple in Zoroastrianism. It has 16 different "kinds of fire", that is, fires gathered from 16 different sources. Currently there are 9 Atash Behram, one in Yazd, Iran and the rest in Western India. They have become a pilgrimage destination.

In India the cathedral fire temple that houses the Iranshah Atash Behram, located in the small town of Udvada in the west coast province of Gujarat, is a pilgrimage destination.

== Cultural pilgrimage ==
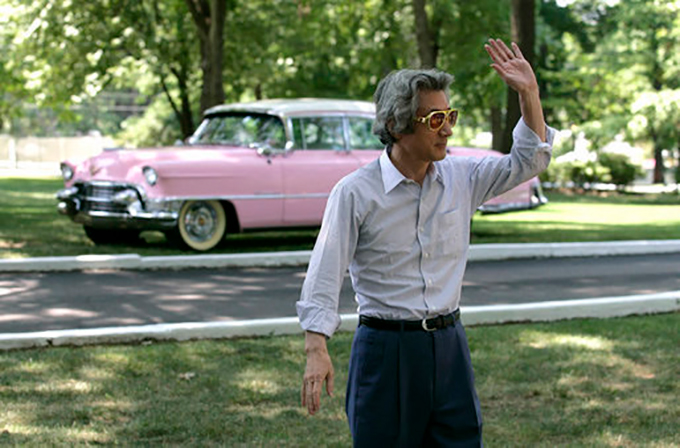
Japanese Prime Minister Junichiro Koizumi, like many fans of Elvis Presley, visited Graceland.

A modern phenomenon is the cultural pilgrimage which, while involving a personal journey, is secular in nature. Destinations for such pilgrims can include historic sites of national or cultural importance, and can be defined as places "of cultural significance: an artist's home, the location of a pivotal event or an iconic destination". An example might be a devotee of the Beatles visiting Liverpool in England or anime fans visiting Akihabara in Tokyo. Destinations for cultural pilgrims include Auschwitz concentration camp, Gettysburg Battlefield or the Ernest Hemingway House. Cultural pilgrims may also travel on religious pilgrimage routes, such as the Way of St. James, with the perspective of making it a historic or architectural tour rather than – or as well as – a religious experience.

Under communist regimes, devout secular pilgrims visited locations such as the Mausoleum of Lenin, the Mausoleum of Mao Zedong and the Birthplace of Karl Marx. Such visits were sometimes state-sponsored. Sites such as these continue to attract visitors. The distinction between religious, cultural or political pilgrimage and tourism is not necessarily always clear or rigid. Pilgrimage could also refer symbolically to journeys, largely on foot, to places where the concerned person(s) expect(s) to find spiritual and/or personal salvation.

== Other ==
=== Meher Baba ===
The main pilgrimage sites associated with the spiritual teacher Meher Baba are Meherabad, India, where Baba completed the "major portion" of his work and where his tomb is now located, and Meherazad, India, where Baba resided later in his life.

== In culture ==
Some prominent literary characters who were pilgrims include:

- Chaucer's The Canterbury Tales recounts tales told by Christian pilgrims on their way to Canterbury Cathedral and the shrine of Thomas Becket.
- In the epic poem Divine Comedy, Dante Alighieri portrays himself as a pilgrim traveling through the afterlife realms of Hell, Purgatory, and Paradise.
- John Bunyan depicted multiple pilgrims (e.g., Christian – the protagonist, Faithful, Talkative, Christiana, Mercy, Old Honest, Mr. Fearing, Mr. Feeble-Mind, Mr. Ready-to-Halt, and Mr. Valiant) as well as false pilgrims (e.g., Formalist, Hypocrisy, and Mr. By-Ends) in his Christian allegory, The Pilgrim's Progress (1678)
- Wilfred of Ivanhoe, a palmer (medieval Christian from Europe who makes a pilgrimage to Jerusalem) and the titular character of Sir Walter Scott's book Ivanhoe
- A palmer plays a significant role representing Reason in Book II of Edmund Spenser's epic poem The Faerie Queene

== See also ==
- Burial places of founders of world religions
- HCPT – The Pilgrimage Trust
- Hiking
- Journey of self-discovery
- Junrei
- List of shrines
- List of significant religious sites
- Monastery
- New Age travellers
- Pardon (ceremony)
- Religion in pre-Islamic Arabia § Pilgrimages
- Romeria
- Sacred travel
- World Youth Day
- Yatra
- Eastbridge Hospital of St Thomas the Martyr, Canterbury
- Russian wandering
