= Kannon-in =

Buddhist temple in Tottori, Japan

- 観音院
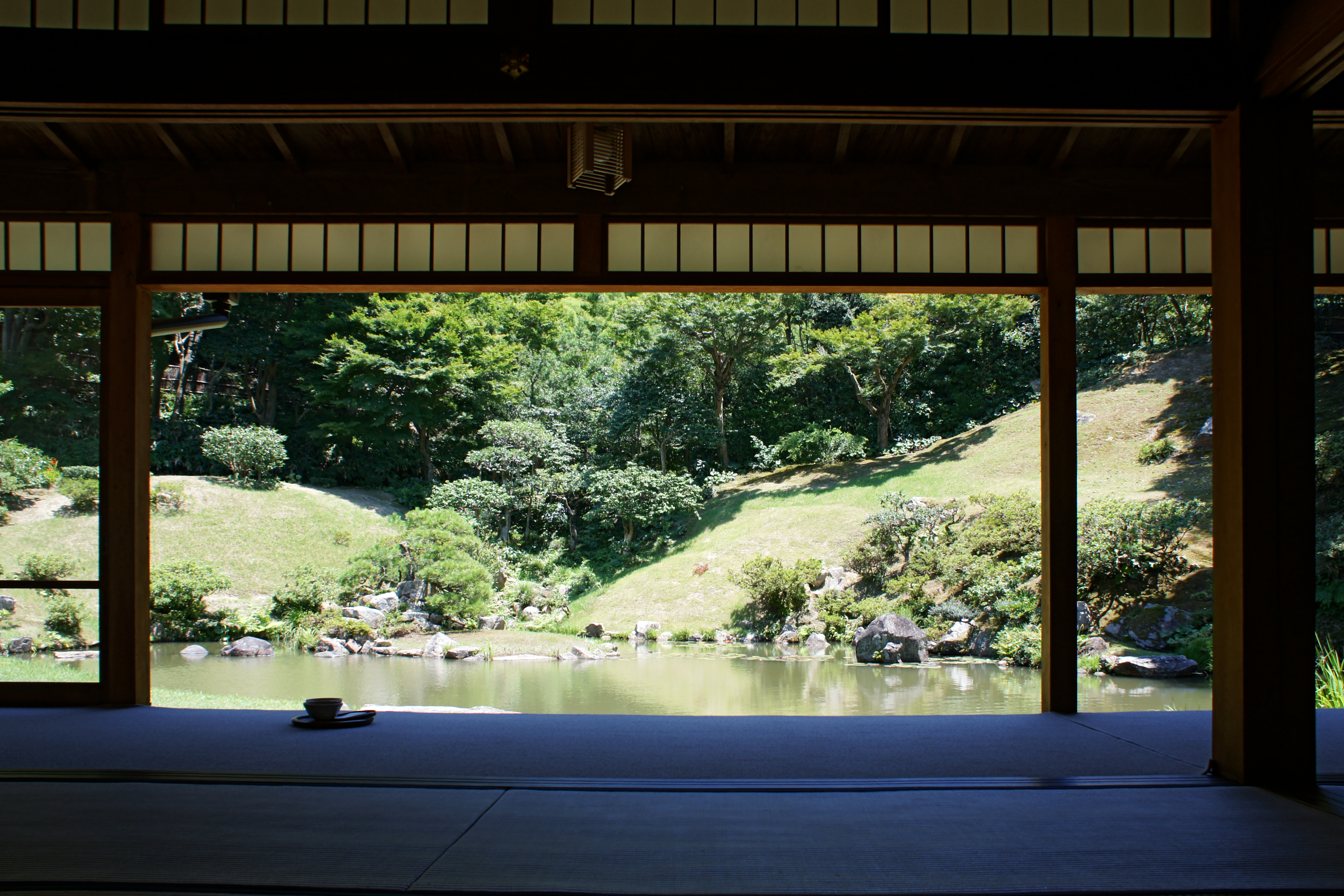
- Garden of Kannon-in

- Kannon-in Kannon-in (Japan)

Religion
- Affiliation: Tendai Buddhism
- Deity: Shōkannon

Location
- Location: 162 Uemachi, Tottori, Tottori Prefecture
- Country: Japan
- Interactive map of Kannon-in
- Coordinates: 35°29′45.92″N 134°14′29.58″E

Architecture
- Completed: 1632

Website
- www.kannon.org/jiin/01/36/index.htm

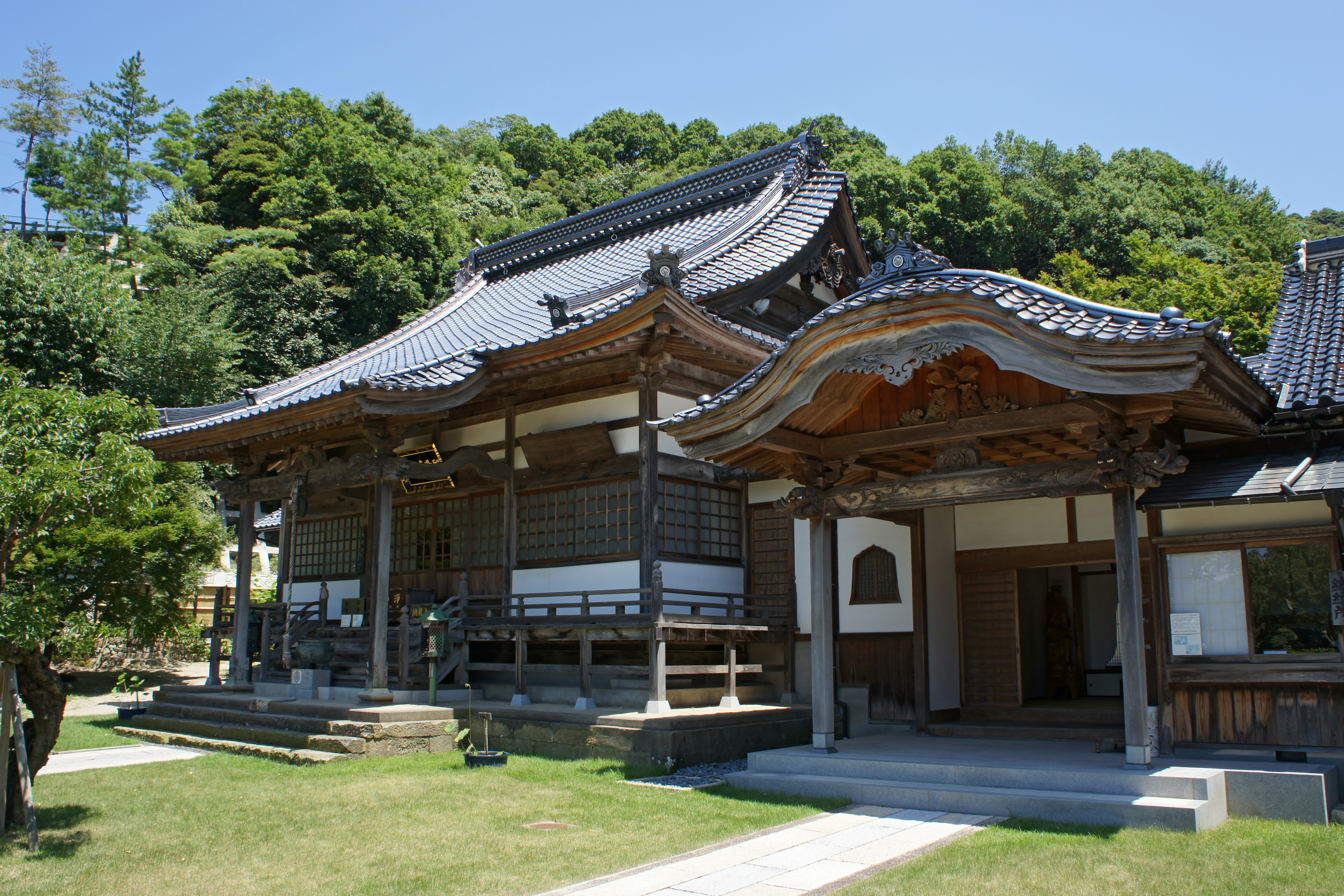
Sho-in study hall

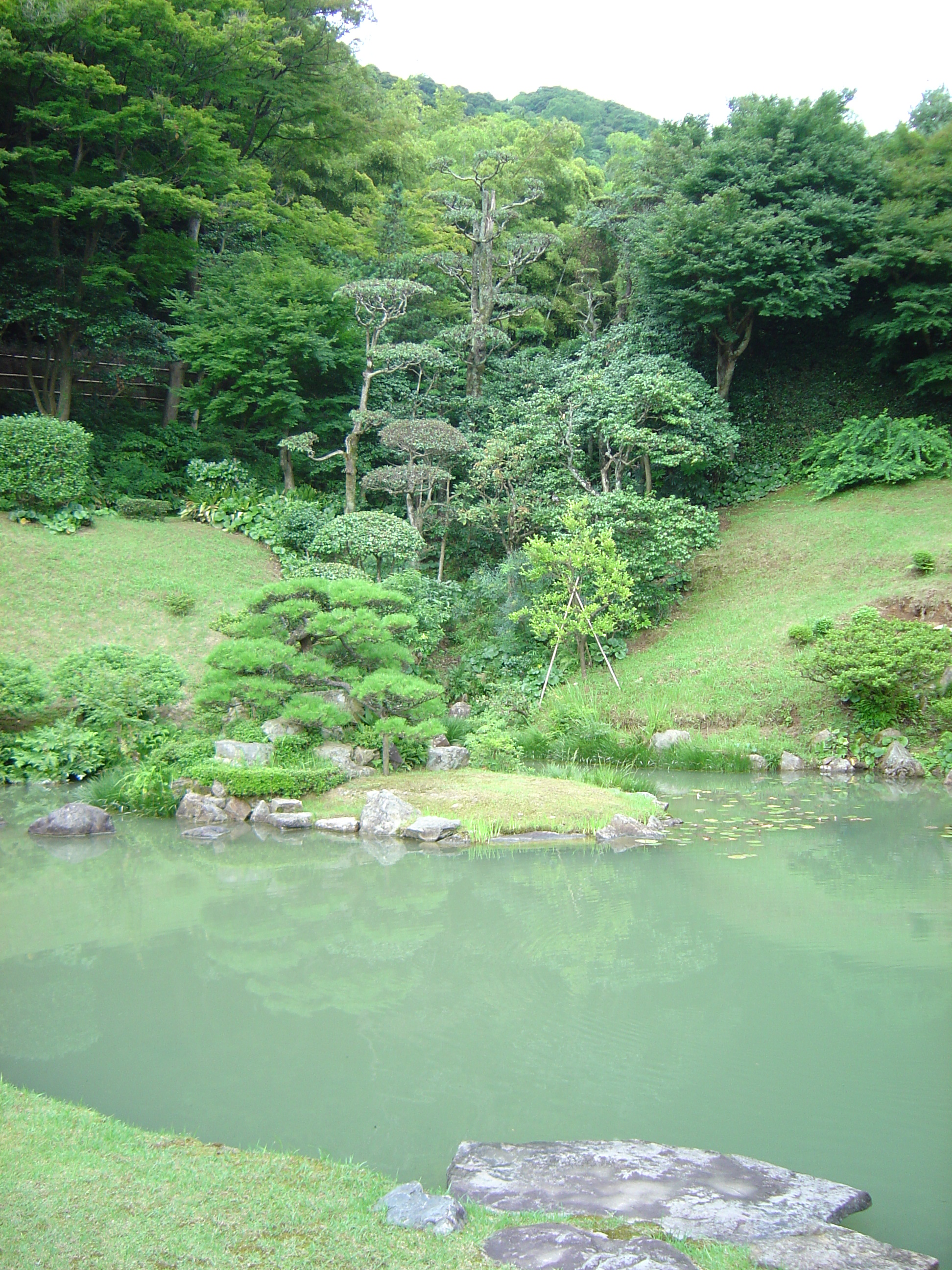
Garden of Kannon-in

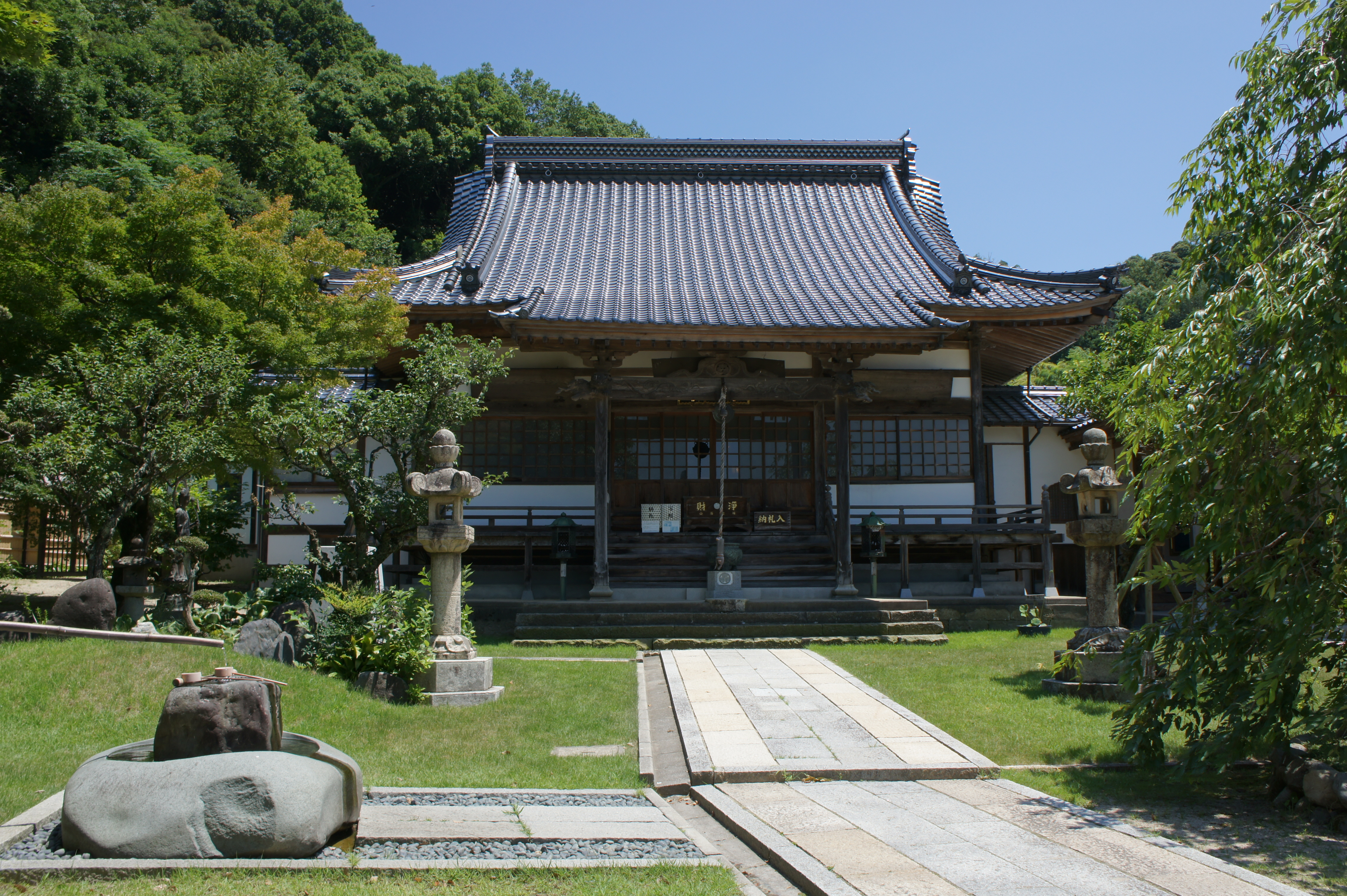
Hondō main hall of Kannon-in

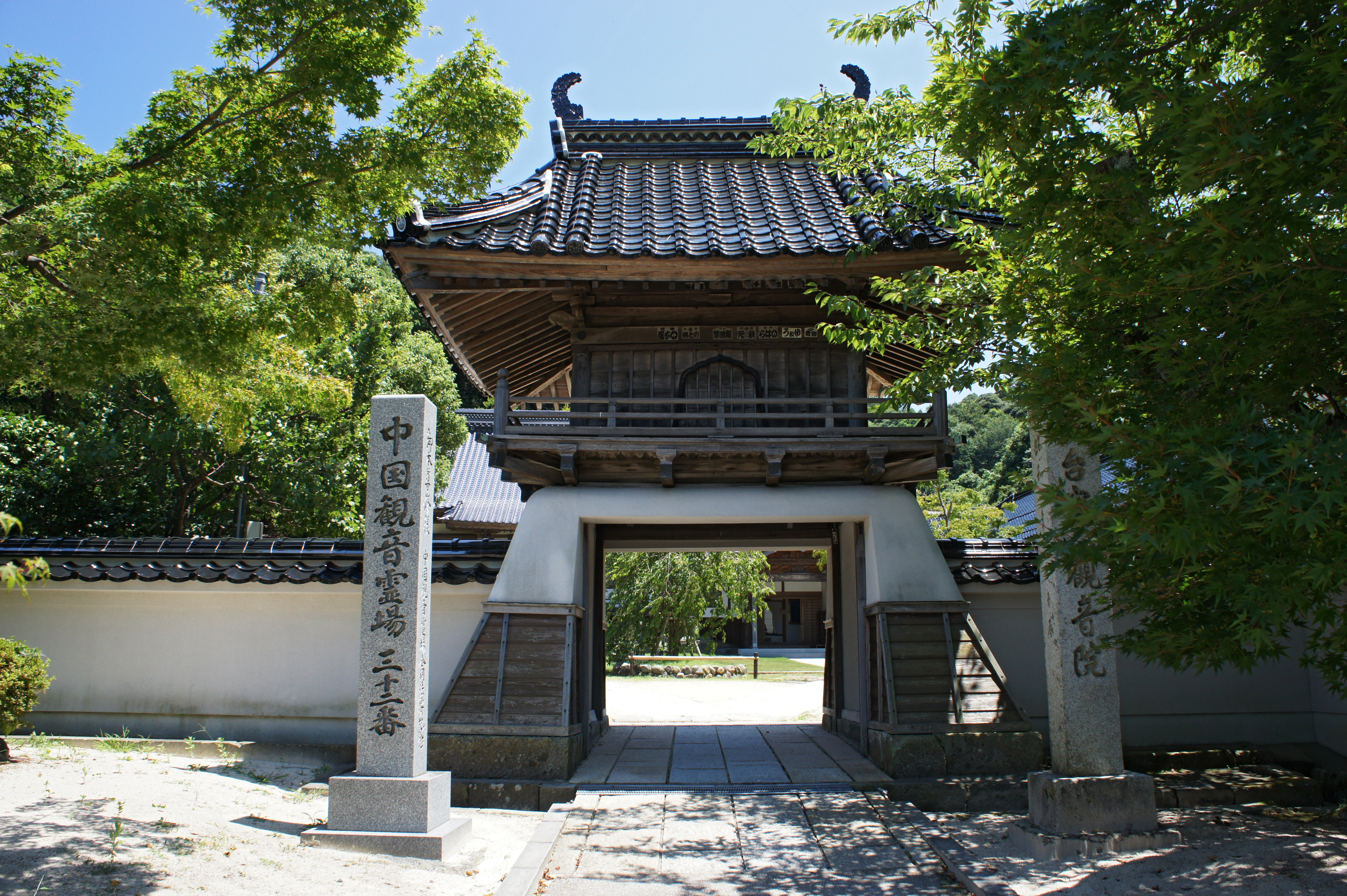
Sanmon gates of Kannon-in

Kannon-in (観音院, Kannon-in), formally known as Fudarakusan Jigen-ji Kannon-in (補陀落山慈眼寺観音院), is a Buddhist temple in Uemachi district of the city of Tottori, Tottori Prefecture, Japan. Kannon-in was built early in the Edo period (1603 – 1868) and is noted for its Edo-style Japanese garden.

== History ==
=== Founding ===
Kannon-in built in the early Edo period and its history is closely related to that of the Ikeda clan. Ikeda Tadakatsu (池田忠雄) (1602 – 1632), daimyō of Okayama Domain in Bizen Province and lord of Okayama Castle, died at a young age and was succeeded by his 3 year old son Ikeda Mitsunaka (池田光仲) (1630 – 1693). The Tokugawa shogunate named the infant Mitsunaka daimyō of Tottori Domain in Hōki and Inaba provinces. In 1632, soon after Mitsunaka's accession to the position of daimyō, Senden (専伝), the fourth chief priest of Kōchin-ji in the present-day Okayama, sent his disciple Gōben to build a temple for the Ikeda clan. Senden ordered Gōben to build the temple in the scenic Kuritani area of present-day Tottori City, and charged him with building prayer temple for the veneration of the Shōkanzeon Bosatsu (聖観世音菩薩), or Kannon Bodhisattva. The temple was named Kannon-in. A statue of the Kannon Bodhisattva, reputably carved from rock from the mountain of Tottori Castle by the Gyōki (668 – 749), a Buddhist priest of the Nara period, was bestowed on the temple.

=== Move to Uemachi site ===
In 1639 the temple was moved to its present location in the Uemachi of present-day Tottori City to serve as a temple for the use of the Tottori Domain. Mitsunaka was deeply devoted to the Kannon Bodhisattva, and became a patron of the temple. At this time the extensive shichidō garan (伽藍) temple complex Kannon-in was planned and built, including its well-known garden. At this time Kannon-in was formally renamed Fudarakusan Jigen-ji Kannon-in. Mitsunaka's oldest son, the second lord of the Tottori Domain, named Kannon-in a kiganji (祈願寺) prayer temple. The temple attained the high status of one of the eight prayer temples (八ヶ寺, hachigatera) of the domain, a status it would retain throughout the Edo period.

=== Later history ===
After the abolition of the han system Kannon-in ceased to be a temple under the patronage of the Ikeda clan, and the temple lost its rice stipend and any form of monetary support. Soon after local adherents of Kannon-in took over the financial support of the temple, support that continues to the present. The Kannon-in garden was designated as a Place of Scenic Beauty by the Japanese government in 1937.

== Garden of Kannon-in ==
The garden of Kannon-in was built is an example of an Edo period Japanese garden in the Chisenkanshō-shiki teien (池泉観賞式庭園) style, which literally means a garden of the "pond appreciation style". A Chisenkanshō-shiki garden is meant to be viewed from a fixed perspective from a single location, rather than a garden to stroll through and view from several angles. In the case of the Kannon-in the garden is viewed from the veranda of the shoin (書院), a hall used for the study of Buddhist sutras. Work on the garden began in 1650, and took ten years to complete. The garden utilizes the gentle slope of the landscape of Kannon-in. A depiction of the garden is found the Kannon-in ezu (観音院絵図), or illustration of Kannon-in, published in the 無駄安留記 (Mudaaruki) in 1858. The Mudaaruki is probably based on earlier works. The bekkan (別館) annex structure in the garden is in a slightly different location in the Mudaaruki than what is seen in the garden today, as the Kannon-in garden was probably restructured during the Meiji period.

== Branch temples ==
Kannon-in has two branch temples.

- Seikyō-ji (清鏡寺), Tachikawachō, Tottori City
- Enjō-ji (円城), Kokufuchō, Tottori City

== Transportation ==
- 8 minutes by taxi from Tottori Station, JR West Sanin Main Line
- 4 minute walk from the Yamanote Kaikan-mae Stop (山の手会館前), Kururi Bus Line (くる梨) Red Course (赤コース) from Tottori Station

== See also ==
- For an explanation of terms used see the Glossary of Japanese Buddhism.

== Order in Buddhist pilgrimage ==
Kannon-in is the 32nd of the Chūgoku 33 Kannon Pilgrimage, a junrei pilgrimage route established in 1981 of 33 Buddhist temples in the dedicated to the Bodhisattva Kannon. The route stretches across the Chūgoku Region of western Japan from Okayama, Hiroshima, Yamaguchi, Shimane and Tottori prefectures.

Preceded by Mani-ji (special)	Chūgoku 33 Kannon Pilgrimage; Kannon-in #32	Succeeded by Daiun-in #33

== See also ==
- List of Places of Scenic Beauty of Japan (Tottori)
