= Chichibu 34 Kannon Sanctuary =

Group of Japanese Buddhist temples

The Chichibu 34 Kannon Sanctuary (秩父札所三十四観音霊場, Chichibu Fudasho Sanjūyon Kannon Reijō) is a group of Japanese Buddhist temples linked on a pilgrimage route.

Chichibu City in the province of Saitama is the centre of a virtually self-contained valley, a mountain-ringed basin about 80 km north-west of Tokyo.

The Chichibu pilgrimage dates back to the early 13th century. It originally consisted of 33 temples dedicated to Kannon but by 1536 a 34th temple was added to the list with the consequence that the Saigoku, Bandō and Chichibu pilgrimages together form a 100-temple Kannon pilgrimage. Visitors in numbers have been making the journey here since the Muromachi Period (1336–1573), covering the 100 kilometres it takes to reach all the temples. About two-thirds of the temples are located in urban areas; the rest are in more rural settings. Unlike the temples on the Saigoku or Bandō routes, the Chichibu temples are relatively small and understated; many of them resemble neighbourhood temples. Admission to all 34 temples is free. It is said that about half of the 34 temples do not have resident priests and are maintained by caretakers who live nearby.

No.	Temple	Honzon (main image)	Location	Coordinates	Image
1	Shimabu-ji (四萬部寺)	Shō Kannon (Aryavalokitesvara)	Chichibu, Saitama	36.027278°N 139.120694°E	Shimabu-ji
2	Shimpuku-ji (真福寺)	Shō Kannon (Aryavalokitesvara)	Chichibu, Saitama	36.0145°N 139.131222°E	Shimpuku-ji
3	Jōsen-ji (常泉寺)	Shō Kannon (Aryavalokitesvara)	Chichibu, Saitama	36.011944°N 139.106611°E	Jōsen-ji
4	Kinshō-ji (金昌寺)	Jūichimen Kannon (Ekādaśamukha)	Chichibu, Saitama	36.006556°N 139.1135°E	Kinshō-ji
5	Goka-dō (語歌堂)	Juntei Kannon (Cundi)	Yokoze, Saitama	35.998806°N 139.106°E	Goka-dō
6	Boku'un-ji (卜雲寺)	Shō Kannon (Aryavalokitesvara)	Yokoze, Saitama	35.983694°N 139.11425°E	Boku'un-ji
7	Hōchō-ji (法長寺)	Jūichimen Kannon (Ekādaśamukha)	Yokoze, Saitama	35.983833°N 139.107889°E	Hōchō-ji
8	Saizen-ji (西善寺)	Jūichimen Kannon (Ekādaśamukha)	Yokoze, Saitama	35.973056°N 139.108694°E	Saizen-ji
9	Akechi-ji (明智寺)	Nyoirin Kannon (Cintāmani-cakra)	Yokoze, Saitama	35.984083°N 139.102806°E	Akechi-ji
10	Daiji-ji (大慈寺)	Shō Kannon (Aryavalokitesvara)	Yokoze, Saitama	35.997167°N 139.095722°E	Daiji-ji
11	Jōraku-ji (常楽寺)	Jūichimen Kannon (Ekādaśamukha)	Chichibu, Saitama	35.993361°N 139.090778°E	Jōraku-ji
12	Nosaka-ji (野坂寺)	Shō Kannon (Aryavalokitesvara)	Chichibu, Saitama	35.983417°N 139.085556°E	Nosaka-ji
13	Jigen-ji (慈眼寺)	Shō Kannon (Aryavalokitesvara)	Chichibu, Saitama	35.992389°N 139.082722°E	Jigen-ji
14	Imamiya-bō (今宮坊)	Shō Kannon (Aryavalokitesvara)	Chichibu, Saitama	35.995083°N 139.078639°E	Imamiya-bō
15	Shōrin-ji (少林寺)	Jūichimen Kannon (Ekādaśamukha)	Chichibu, Saitama	35.995222°N 139.08525°E	Shōrin-ji
16	Saikō-ji (西光寺)	Senju Kannon (Sahasra-bhuja)	Chichibu, Saitama	36.000583°N 139.077472°E	Saikō-ji
17	Jōrin-ji (定林寺)	Jūichimen Kannon (Ekādaśamukha)	Chichibu, Saitama	36.005722°N 139.08425°E	Jōrin-ji
18	Gōdo-ji (神門寺)	Shō Kannon (Aryavalokitesvara)	Chichibu, Saitama	36.009972°N 139.092389°E	Gōdo-ji
19	Ryūseki-ji (龍石寺)	Senju Kannon (Sahasra-bhuja)	Chichibu, Saitama	36.0175°N 139.089167°E	Ryūseki-ji
20	Iwanoue-dō (岩之上堂)	Shō Kannon (Aryavalokitesvara)	Chichibu, Saitama	36.017444°N 139.084472°E	Iwanoue-dō
21	Kannon-ji (観音寺)	Shō Kannon (Aryavalokitesvara)	Chichibu, Saitama	36.015944°N 139.077917°E	Kannon-ji
22	Dōji-dō (童子堂)	Shō Kannon (Aryavalokitesvara)	Chichibu, Saitama	36.00725°N 139.073167°E	Dōji-dō
23	Ongaku-ji (音楽寺)	Shō Kannon (Aryavalokitesvara)	Chichibu, Saitama	36.006028°N 139.062083°E	Ongaku-ji
24	Hōsen-ji (法泉寺)	Shō Kannon (Aryavalokitesvara)	Chichibu, Saitama	35.9875°N 139.060972°E	Hōsen-ji
25	Kyūshō-ji (久昌寺)	Shō Kannon (Aryavalokitesvara)	Chichibu, Saitama	35.971583°N 139.048778°E	Kyūshō-ji
26	En'yū-ji (円融寺)	Shō Kannon (Aryavalokitesvara)	Chichibu, Saitama	35.972472°N 139.073°E	En'yū-ji
27	Daien-ji (大渕寺)	Shō Kannon (Aryavalokitesvara)	Chichibu, Saitama	35.967694°N 139.066833°E	Daien-ji
28	Hashidate-dō (橋立堂)	Batō Kannon (Hayagrīva)	Chichibu, Saitama	35.9605°N 139.061028°E	Hashidate-dō
29	Chōsen-in (長泉院)	Shō Kannon (Aryavalokitesvara)	Chichibu, Saitama	35.960333°N 139.05°E	Chōsen-in
30	Hōun-ji (法雲寺)	Nyoirin Kannon (Cintāmani-cakra)	Chichibu, Saitama	35.951278°N 138.991417°E	Hōun-ji
31	Kannon-in (観音院)	Shō Kannon (Aryavalokitesvara)	Ogano, Saitama	36.041056°N 138.953861°E	Kannon-in
32	Hōshō-ji (法性寺)	Shō Kannon (Aryavalokitesvara)	Ogano, Saitama	35.996639°N 139.012944°E	Hōshō-ji
33	Kikusui-ji (菊水寺)	Shō Kannon (Aryavalokitesvara)	Chichibu, Saitama	36.030889°N 139.042278°E	Kikusui-ji
34	Suisen-ji (水潜寺)	Senju Kannon (Sahasra-bhuja)	Minano, Saitama	36.081833°N 139.053778°E	Suisen-ji

== See also ==
- Japan 100 Kannon, pilgrimage composed of the Saigoku, Bandō and Chichibu pilgrimages
  - Saigoku 33 Kannon, pilgrimage in the Kansai region
  - Bandō 33 Kannon, pilgrimage in the Kantō region
- The hundred Kannon Prilgrimage in Musashi Province, pilgrimage composed of the Chichibu, Musashino and Sayama pilgrimages
  - Musashino Kannon Pilgrimage, pilgrimage in Tokyo and Saitama prefectures
  - Sayama Kannon Pilgrimage, pilgrimage in Tokyo and Saitama prefectures
- Shikoku Pilgrimage, 88 Temple pilgrimage in the Shikoku island
- Chūgoku 33 Kannon, pilgrimage in the Chūgoku region
- Kannon
- Buddhism in Japan
- Tourism in Japan
