= Musashino Kannon Pilgrimage =

Japanese Buddhist temple pilgrimage route

Sanctuaries in Saitama
Sanctuaries in Tokyo

The Musashino Kannon Pilgrimage (Japanese: 武蔵野三十三観音霊場, Musashino Sanjūsan(33) Kan-non Reijō) is a Japanese pilgrimage of thirty-three Buddhist temples and an extra one, founded 1940. The temples located in Tokyo and Saitama prefectures, and along the Seibu Railway (formerly name is "Musashino" Railway). The sanctuaries are situated nearby urban area of Tokyo, and the Musashino Kannon Pilgrimage Ground Association prepares dedicated stamp books for this pilgrimage, so it can be said it is a kind of relatively easy pilgrimage. Each temple has its own go-eika, which is a kind of tanka for pilgrimage. In addition, it is sometimes called "The hundred (Note: Excluding extras, Musashino has 33 sanctuaries, Chichibu has 34 one, and Sayama has 33 one, that is, the total is 100.) Kannon Prilgrimage in Musashi Province (Note: Tokyo, Saitama and part of Kanagawa was called Musashi Province until the Edo period.)" together with the Chichibu 34 Kannon Sanctuary and the Sayama Kannon Pilgrimage.

== History ==
The Musashino Kannon Pilgrimage was founded by Jōe Shibata, who was a Japanese local historian, in 1940, and the opening event was held at Sanpō-ji, which is third one in the temples list, on May 1, 1941. But, it had been in decline and dormant for decades after the World War II. It is because the area suffered war damage, so the temples could not ready to accept pilgrims. Thereafter the Musashino Kannon Pilgrimage Ground Association was reorganized on April 2, 1993, and the official website has also opened. In 2000, all the temples did kaichō, which is public exhibition of religious objects, to commemorate the 60th anniversary of the founding. It is the first time of kaicho from re-founding. After that, the anniversary events have been held every 5 years.

== Location ==
The sanctuaries are located along the Seibu Railway from the urban area of Tokyo to the mountainous area. (Most of them are along Ikebukuro Line, its branch lines and Chichibu line, and others are along Shinjuku line and its branch lines) So, them in the first half are often in residential areas, but some of them in the last half are in mountain forests. For this reason, traveling for pilgrimage becomes gradually difficult, but it's hiking level, not climbing.

== Temples ==
The following list contains all the temples of the Musashino Kannon Pilgrimage.

No.	Temple	Sect	Honzon (Main Image)	City/Ward	Prefecture	Image	Nearest Station	Coordinates
1	Chōmei-ji 長命寺	Shingon-shū Buzan-ha	Jūichimen Kannon (Ekādaśamukha)	Nerima	Tokyo	Chōmei-ji	Nerima-Takanodai	35°44′38.7″N 139°36′51.1″E
2	Dōjō-ji 道場寺	Sōtō-shū	Shō Kannon (Avalokiteśvara)	Nerima	Tokyo	Dōjō-ji	Shakujii-kōen	35°44′11″N 139°35′55″E
3	Sanpō-ji 三寳寺	Shingon-shū Chisan-ha	Nyoirin Kannon (Cintāmaṇicakra)	Nerima	Tokyo	Sanpō-ji	Shakujii-kōen	35°44′9.8″N 139°35′47.9″E
4	Nyoirin-ji 如意輪寺 (Hōya Kannon/保谷観音)	Shingon-shū Chisan-ha	Nyoirin Kannon (Cintāmaṇicakra)	Nishitōkyō	Tokyo	Nyoirin-ji	Hibarigaoka	35°44′30.4″N 139°33′5.8″E
5	Tamon-ji 多聞寺	Shingon-shū Chisan-ha	Jūichimen Kannon (Ekādaśamukha)	Higashikurume	Tokyo	Tamon-ji	Higashi-kurume	35°45′17.7″N 139°31′45.5″E
6	Zenryū-ji 全龍寺	Sōtō-shū	Ichiyo Kannon	Kiyose	Tokyo	Zenryū-ji	Kiyose	35°46′42.9″N 139°31′36.6″E
7	Tokuzō-ji 徳蔵寺	Rinzai-shū Daitoku-ji-ha	Byakue Kannon (pandara vasini)	Higashimurayama	Tokyo		Higashi-murayama	35°46′14.8″N 139°28′4.8″E
8	Enjō-in 圓乗院	Shingon-shū Chisan-ha	Nyoirin Kannon (Cintāmaṇicakra)	Higashiyamato	Tokyo		Musashi-Yamato	35°45′17.8″N 139°26′11.6″E
9	Jitsuzō-in 實蔵院	Shingon-shū Buzan-ha	Shō Kannon (Avalokiteśvara)	Tokorozawa	Saitama	Jitsuzō-in	Kōkū-kōen	35°47′26.3″N 139°27′48.2″E
10	Shinkō-ji 新光寺	Shingon-shū Buzan-ha	Shō Kannon (Avalokiteśvara)	Tokorozawa	Saitama		Kōkū-kōen	35°47′33″N 139°27′43.3″E
11	Fumon-in 普門院	Shingon-shū Buzan-ha	Senju Kannon (Sahasrabhuja)	Tokorozawa	Saitama		Nishi-Tokorozawa	35°47′28.5″N 139°26′53.1″E
12	Zentoku-ji 全徳寺	Sōtō-shū	Fuhi Kannon	Tokorozawa	Saitama	Zentoku-ji	Kotesashi	35°47′12.8″N 139°25′25.3″E
13	Konjō-in 金乗院 (Yamaguchi Kannon/山口観音)	Shingon-shū Buzan-ha	Senju Kannon (Sahasrabhuja)	Tokorozawa	Saitama	Konjō-in	Seibukyūjō-mae	35°46′06.8″N 139°24′53.0″E
14	Myōzen-in 妙善院	Sōtō-shū	Byakue Kannon (pandara vasini)	Tokorozawa	Saitama	Myōzen-in	Sayamagaoka	35°47′42.7″N 139°24′30″E
15	Shōrin-ji 松林寺	Sōtō-shū	Senju Kannon (Sahasrabhuja)	Tokorozawa	Saitama		Sayamagaoka	35°48′14.7″N 139°23′42.3″E
16	Jigen-ji 慈眼寺	Sōtō-shū	Shō Kannon (Avalokiteśvara)	Sayama	Saitama		Sayamashi	35°51′17.8″N 139°24′29.7″E
17	Tokurin-ji 徳林寺	Sōtō-shū	Shō Kannon (Avalokiteśvara)	Sayama	Saitama	Tokurin-ji	Sayamashi	35°51′32.7″N 139°24′41.6″E
18	Rnege-in 蓮花院 (Kurosu Kannon/黒須観音)	Shingon-shū Chisan-ha	Senju Kannon (Sahasrabhuja)	Iruma	Saitama		Irumashi	35°50′53.8″N 139°23′16.8″E
19	Tōkō-ji 東光寺	Shingon-shū Buzan-ha	Shō Kannon (Avalokiteśvara)	Iruma	Saitama	Tōkō-ji	Bushi	35°49′39.2″N 139°21′53.1″E
20	Ryūen-ji 龍圓寺 (Araku Kannon/新久観音)	Shingon-shū Chisan-ha	Senju Kannon (Sahasrabhuja)	Iruma	Saitama	Ryūen-ji	Bushi	35°49′33.3″N 139°21′42.8″E
21	Kōshō-ji 高正寺	Sōtō-shū	Shō Kannon (Avalokiteśvara)	Iruma	Saitama		Bushi	35°50′7.8″N 139°21′18.4″E
22	Enshō-ji 圓照寺 (Motokaji Bishamonten/元加治弁財天)	Shingon-shū Chisan-ha	Nyoirin Kannon (Cintāmaṇicakra)	Iruma	Saitama	Enshō-ji	Motokaji	35°50′22.2″N 139°20′47.4″E
23	Jōshin-ji 浄心寺 (Yaoroshi Bishamonten/矢颪毘沙門天)	Sōtō-shū	Jūichimen Kannon (Ekādaśamukha)	Hannō	Saitama		Hannō	35°50′45.7″N 139°18′45.5″E
24	Kannon-ji 観音寺	Shingon-shū Chisan-ha	Nyoirin Kannon (Cintāmaṇicakra)	Hannō	Saitama	Kannon-ji	Hannō	35°51′22.8″N 139°18′46.2″E
25	Ensen-ji 圓泉寺	Shingon-shū Chisan-ha	Jūichimen Kannon (Ekādaśamukha)	Hannō	Saitama	Ensen-ji	Higashi-Hannō	35°52′6.7″N 139°20′52.3″E
Extra	Reigan-ji 靈巖寺	Shingon-shū Chisan-ha	Shō Kannon (Avalokiteśvara)	Hidaka	Saitama		Koma	35°54′0.4″N 139°19′25.2″E
26	Shōden-in 聖天院	Shingon-shū Chisan-ha	Shō Kannon (Avalokiteśvara)	Hidaka	Saitama	Shōden-in	Koma	35°53′42.8″N 139°19′14.3″E
27	Shōon-ji 勝音寺	Rinzai-shū Kenchō-ji-ha	Jūichimen Kannon (Ekādaśamukha)	Hidaka	Saitama		Koma	35°53′27.8″N 139°19′8.2″E
28	Ryūsen-ji 瀧泉寺	Shingon-shū Chisan-ha	Senju Kannon (Sahasrabhuja)	Hidaka	Saitama		Musashi-Yokote	35°52′50.3″N 139°17′28.6″E
29	Chōnen-ji 長念寺	Sōtō-shū	Shō Kannon (Avalokiteśvara)	Hidaka	Saitama	Chōnen-ji	Musashi-Yokote	35°53′14.8″N 139°16′20.4″E
30	Fukutoku-ji 福徳寺	Rinzai-shū Kenchō-ji-ha	Shō Kannon (Avalokiteśvara)	Hannō	Saitama	Fukutoku-ji	Higashi-Agano	35°53′51.6″N 139°15′38.8″E
31	Hōkō-ji 法光寺	Sōtō-shū	Jūichimen Kannon (Ekādaśamukha)	Hannō	Saitama		Agano	35°54′31″N 139°13′30″E
32	Tenryū-ji 天龍寺 (Neno-Gongen/子の権現)	Tendai-shū	Jūichimen Kannon (Ekādaśamukha)	Hannō	Saitama	Tenryū-ji	Nishi-Agano	35°54′26.5″N 139°11′21.3″E
33	Hachiō-ji 八王寺 (Take-dera/竹寺)	Tendai-shū	Shō Kannon (Avalokiteśvara)	Hannō	Saitama	Hachiō-ji	Hannō	35°53′24.3″N 139°11′32.4″E

== See also ==
- The hundred Kannon Prilgrimage in Musashi Province, pilgrimage composed of the Chichibu, Musashino and Sayama pilgrimages.
  - Chichibu 34 Kannon Sanctuary, pilgrimage in Saitama Prefecture.
  - Sayama Kannon Pilgrimage, pilgrimage in Tokyo and Saitama prefectures.
- Japan 100 Kannon, pilgrimage composed of the Saigoku, Bandō and Chichibu pilgrimages.
  - Saigoku 33 Kannon, pilgrimage in the Kansai region.
  - Bandō 33 Kannon, pilgrimage in the Kantō region.
  - Chichibu 34 Kannon, pilgrimage in Saitama Prefecture.
- Shikoku Pilgrimage, 88 Temple pilgrimage in the Shikoku island.
- Chūgoku 33 Kannon Pilgrimage, pilgrimage in the Chūgoku region.
- Kannon
- Buddhism in Japan
- Tourism in Japan
