= Chūgoku 33 Kannon Pilgrimage =

Buddhist pilgrimage route in western Japan

The Chūgoku 33 Kannon Pilgrimage (中国三十三観音霊場, Chūgoku Sanjūsan Kannon Reijō) is one of a number of traditional Buddhist pilgrimage routes in Japan. The route includes 33 sites sacred to the boddhisattva Kannon, across the Chūgoku region (Okayama, Hiroshima, Yamaguchi, Shimane and Tottori prefectures). The 33 Kannon were selected in 1981.

No.	Temple	Location	Coordinates	Image
1	Saidai-ji (Okayama)	Okayama, Okayama	34.653639°N 134.104722°E	Saidai-ji
2	Yokei-ji	Setouchi, Okayama	34.654417°N 134.061389°E	Yokei-ji
3	Shōraku-ji (Senjū-in)	Bizen, Okayama	34.760667°N 134.25625°E	Shōraku-ji
Special	Tanjō-ji (Okayama)	Kumenan, Okayama	34.95525°N 133.953°E	Tanjō-ji
4	Kiyama-ji (Kanji-in)	Maniwa, Okayama	35.017203°N 133.715072°E	Jōju-bashi bridge and Furō-mon gate, Kiyama-ji
5	Henshō-ji (Hōkai-in)	Okayama, Okayama	34.693944°N 133.934139°E	Hōkai-in
6	Rendai-ji	Kurashiki, Okayama	34.505625°N 133.850694°E	Rendai-ji
7	Entsū-ji	Kurashiki, Okayama	34.541172°N 133.662894°E	Entsū-ji
8	Enkō-ji (Myō-ō-in)	Fukuyama, Hiroshima	34.478722°N 133.345972°E	Myō-ō-in
9	Jōdo-ji (Daijōritsu-in)	Onomichi, Hiroshima	34.412167°N 133.210306°E	Jōdo-ji
Special	Saigoku-ji (Sōji-in)	Onomichi, Hiroshima	34.415917°N 133.203389°E	Saigoku-ji
10	Senkō-ji	Onomichi, Hiroshima	34.410925°N 133.198783°E	Senkō-ji
11	Kōjō-ji	Onomichi, Hiroshima	34.306556°N 133.086833°E	Kōjō-ji
12	Buttsū-ji	Mihara, Hiroshima	34.455861°N 133.026556°E	Buttsū-ji
13	Mitaki-dera (Mitaki-Kannon)	Hiroshima	34.420306°N 132.437611°E	Mitaki-dera
14	Suishō-ji (Daishō-in)	Miyajima, Hiroshima	34.291944°N 132.318472°E	Daishō-in
Special	Hannya-ji	Hirao, Yamaguchi	33.941576°N 132.106961°E	
15	Kanyō-ji	Shunan, Yamaguchi	34.2355°N 131.815083°E	
16	Tōshun-ji (洞春寺)	Yamaguchi, Yamaguchi	34.188021°N 131.471160°E	
17	Ryūzō-ji (龍蔵寺)	Yamaguchi, Yamaguchi	34.167713°N 131.412210°E	
18	Sōrin-ji (宗隣寺)	Ube, Yamaguchi	33.966195°N 131.252586°E	
19	Kōzan-ji	Shimonoseki, Yamaguchi	33.995889°N 130.981917°E	Kōzan-ji
20	Daishō-in (Hagi)	Hagi, Yamaguchi	34.395417°N 131.391361°E	
21	Kannon-in (Hagi)	Hagi, Yamaguchi	34.409728°N 131.377561°E	
22	Tada-ji	Hamada, Shimane	34.927221°N 132.105196°E	
23	Kando-ji	Izumo, Shimane	35.352109°N 132.752238°E	
24	Zenjō-ji	Unnan, Shimane	35.283129°N 132.829112°E	
25	Gakuen-ji (Ichijō-in)	Izumo, Shimane	35.42325°N 132.749389°E	Gakuen-ji
26	Ichihata-ji	Izumo, Shimane	35.496775°N 132.874103°E	Ichihata-ji
27	Unju-ji	Yasugi, Shimane	35.394603°N 133.267201°E	
28	Kiyomizu-dera (Yasugi)	Yasugi, Shimane	35.40225°N 133.281889°E	Kiyomizu-dera
29	Daisen-ji	Daisen, Tottori	35.390972°N 133.534861°E	Daisen-ji
30	Chōkoku-ji (Tottori)	Kurayoshi, Tottori	35.426722°N 133.818389°E	Chōkoku-ji
31	Sanbutsu-ji	Misasa, Tottori	35.399306°N 133.95575°E	Sanbutsu-ji
Special	Mani-ji	Tottori, Tottori	35.529944°N 134.263222°E	Mani-ji
32	Kannon-in	Tottori, Tottori	35.496089°N 134.24155°E	Kannon-in
33	Daiun-in	Tottori, Tottori	35.492222°N 134.244917°E	Daiun-in

== See also ==
- Japan 100 Kannon, pilgrimage composed of the Saigoku, Bandō and Chichibu pilgrimages.
  - Saigoku 33 Kannon, pilgrimage in the Kansai region.
  - Bandō 33 Kannon, pilgrimage in the Kantō region.
  - Chichibu 34 Kannon, pilgrimage in Saitama Prefecture.
- Shikoku Pilgrimage, 88 Temple pilgrimage in the Shikoku island.
- Musashino Kannon Pilgrimage, pilgrimage in Tokyo and Saitama prefectures.
- Kannon
- Buddhism in Japan
- Tourism in Japan
