= Japan 100 Kannon Pilgrimage =

The Japan 100 Kannon (日本百観音, Nihon Hyaku Kannon) is a pilgrimage circuit that is composed of the following three independent pilgrimage circuits:

- Saigoku 33 Kannon (西国三十三所, Saigoku Sanjūsansho), in the Kansai region.
- Bandō 33 Kannon (坂東三十三箇所, Bandō Sanjūsankasho), in the Kantō region.
- Chichibu 34 Kannon (秩父三十四箇所, Chichibu Sanjūyonkasho), in Chichibu, Saitama.

The Chichibu 34 Kannon pilgrimage originally had 33 temples, but in 1525 another one was added in order have a hundred temples when joined to the circuits of the Saigoku and Bandō pilgrimages.

== See also ==
- Shikoku Pilgrimage, 88 Temple pilgrimage in the Shikoku island
- Musashino Kannon Pilgrimage, pilgrimage in Tokyo and Saitama prefectures
- Chūgoku 33 Kannon, pilgrimage in the Chūgoku region
- Kannon
