= Junrei =

Pilgrimage in Japan

Junrei (巡礼) is the word most commonly used for either of two major types of pilgrimages in Japan, in accordance with Buddhism or Shinto. These pilgrimages can be made as a visit to a group of temples, shrines, or other holy sites, in a particular order, often in a circuit of 33 or 88 sites. Other pilgrimages may center on a pilgrimage to a single site. One of the most popular pilgrimages for Buddhists in Japan is visiting the 88 temples on Shikoku. In certain contexts, junrei can be used to refer to other pilgrimage practices in world religions foreign to Japan, such as the Hajj.

Pilgrimages can be organized by tour bus companies, taking only a couple of weeks to complete, although many pilgrims prefer to take the two- or three-month-long journeys on foot in the traditional manner. Pilgrims on the Shikoku junrei are referred to as henro (遍路) and traditionally wear straw hats and white clothing.

== Traditional observances ==
There are a number of rules traditionally observed while on a junrei.

- Pilgrimage as the ascetic.
- Must not kill any living things.
- Must not say immoral things to women.
- Have some medicines for your unexpected bad condition.
- Must not drink any alcohol.
- Do not quarrel with your partner.
- Do not have a lot of money.
- Do not have unnecessary baggage.
- Pay attention to your food hygiene.
- Go to an inn before it gets dark.
- Must not go out of an inn during the night.

== Bibliography ==
- Ambros, Barbara (1997). Liminal journeys: Pilgrimages of noblewomen in mid-Heian Japan, Japanese Journal of Religious Studies 24 (3-4), 301-345
- Hoshino, Eiki (1997). Pilgrimage and peregrination: Contextualizing the Saikoku junrei and the Shikoku henro, Japanese Journal of Religious Studies 24 (3-4), 271-299
- MacWilliams, Mark W. (1997). Temple myths and the popularization of Kannon pilgrimage in Japan: A case study of Ōya-ji on the Bandō Route, Japanese Journal of Religious Studies 24 (3-4), 375-411
- Reader, Ian and Swanson, Paul L. (1997). Editors’ introduction: Pilgrimage in the Japanese religious tradition, Japanese Journal of Religious Studies 24 (3-4), 225-270
- Reader, Ian (1997). Review: Local Histories, Anthropological Interpretations, and the Study of a Japanese Pilgrimage, Japanese Journal of Religious Studies 30 (1-2), 119-132
- Reader, Ian (1991). Religion in Contemporary Japan, Honolulu: University of Hawaii Press
- Watkins, L. (2008). Japanese travel culture: An investigation of the links between early Japanese pilgrimage and modern Japanese travel behaviour, New Zealand Journal of Asian Studies 10 (2), 93-110
