= List of historic sites of Japan (Saitama) =

This list is of the historic sites of Japan located within the Prefecture of Saitama.

== National Historic Sites ==
As of 6 August 2025, twenty-six Sites have been designated as being of national significance (including one *Special Historic Site).

| Site | Municipality | Comments | Image | Coordinates | Type | Ref. |
|---|---|---|---|---|---|---|
| *Sakitama Kofun Cluster 埼玉古墳群 Sakitama kofun-gun | Gyōda | Kofun period tumuli | Sakitama Kofun Cluster | 36°07′38″N 139°28′54″E | 1 | 603 |
| Ōya Tile Kiln ruins 大谷瓦窯跡 Ōya kawara kama ato | Higashimatsuyama | Hakuho period kiln ruins | Suedono Tile Kiln Site | 36°04′16″N 139°24′08″E | 6 | 609 |
| Omishinkanji Kofun 小見真観寺古墳 Omishinkanji kofun | Gyōda | Kofun period tumulus | Omishinkanji Kofun | 36°09′34″N 139°28′36″E | 1 | 599 |
| Kawagoekan Site 河越館跡 Kawagoekan ato | Kawagoe | fortified residence of the Kawagoe clan (河越氏) from the late Heian to the Nanbokuchō period | Kawagoekan Site | 35°55′50″N 139°27′04″E | 2 | 617 |
| Kurohama Shell Mound 黒浜貝塚 Kurohama kaizuka | Hasuda | Jōmon period midden and settlement trace | Kurohama Shell Mound | 35°59′32″N 139°39′44″E | 1 | 00003499 |
| Gobōyama Site 午王山遺跡 Gobōyama iseki | Wakō | Yayoi period settlement trace | | 35°47′46″N 139°37′35″E | 1 | 00004094 |
| Komae Village Stone Age Dwelling Site 高麗村石器時代住居跡 Komae-mura sekki-jidai jūkyo ato | Hidaka | Jōmon period settlement trace | Komae Village Stone Age Dwelling Site | 35°53′00″N 139°18′14″E | 1 | 607 |
| Shimozato-Aoyama Stele Production Site 下里・青山板碑製作遺跡 Shimozato-Aoyama itabi seiskau iseki | Ogawa | Kamakura through Muromachi period stele production location | | 36°03′24″N 139°15′42″E | 6 | 00003858 |
| Shinpukuji Shell Mound 真福寺貝塚 Shinpukuji kaizuka | Saitama | Jōmon period midden and settlement trace | Shinpukuji Shell Mound | 35°56′26″N 139°42′24″E | 1 | 615 |
| Shinmei Shell Mound 神明貝塚 Shinmei kaizuka | Kasukabe | Jōmon period midden and settlement trace | Shinmei Shell Mound | 36°02′16″N 139°48′21″E | 1 | 00004093 |
| Suedono Tile Kiln ruins 水殿瓦窯跡 Suedono kawara kama ato | Misato | Kamakura period kiln ruins | Suedono Tile Kiln ruins | 36°11′28″N 139°09′45″E | 6 | 600 |
| Tochimoto Barrier 栃本関跡 Tochimoto-no-seki ato | Chichibu | Edo period checkpoint | Tochimoto Barrier Site | 35°56′41″N 138°51′45″E | 6 | 613 |
| Nogamishimogō Stele 野上下郷石塔婆 Nogamishimogō ishi tōba | Nagatoro | Nanboku-chō period stone votive monument | Nogamishimogō Stele | 36°08′03″N 139°07′40″E | 3 | 597 |
| Hachigata Castle ruins 鉢形城跡 Hachigata-jō ato | Yorii | Sengoku period castle ruins | Hachigata Castle ruins | 36°06′28″N 139°11′45″E | 2 | 601 |
| Hanawa Hokiichi former residence 塙保己一旧宅 Hanawa Hokiichi kyū-taku | Honjō | Edo period blind Kokugaku scholar residence | Hanawa Hokiichi former residence | 36°12′14″N 139°06′58″E | 8 | 605 |
| Hara kanga ruins 幡羅官衙遺跡群 Hara kanga iseki-gun | Fukaya, Kumagaya | Nara period government administration complex ruins; designation includes the Nishibe Fusaishi Site (西別府祭祀遺跡) | Hara Kanga ruins | 36°11′51″N 139°16′53″E | 2 | 00004021 |
| Hiki Fortification ruins 比企城館跡群 Hiki-jō kan ato-gun | Ranzan | Gengoku period fortification ruins; designation includes the sites of Sugaya Yakata (pictured), Musashi-Matsuyama Castle, Sugiyama Castle, & Ogura Castle | Hiki Fortification ruins | 36°02′14″N 139°25′17″E | 2 | 614 |
| Mizuko Shell Mound 水子貝塚 Mizuko kaizuka | Fujimi | Jōmon period midden and settlement trace | Mizuko Shell Mound | 35°50′44″N 139°33′40″E | 1 | 612 |
| Minamikawara Stele 南河原石塔婆 Minamikawara ishi tōba | Gyōda | Kamakura period stone votive monuments | | 36°10′48″N 139°25′30″E | 3 | 596 |
| Minuma Tsūsen-bori 見沼通船堀 Minuma tsūsen-bori | Saitama, Kawaguchi | Edo period canal | Minuma Tsūsen-bori | 35°51′44″N 139°42′38″E | 6 | 616 |
| Miyazuka Kofun 宮塚古墳 Miyazuka kofun | Kumagaya | Kofun period tumulus | Miyazuka Kofun | 36°09′06″N 139°20′43″E | 1 | 608 |
| Hundred Caves of Yoshimi 吉見百穴 Yoshimi hyakketsu | Yoshimi | Kofun period necropolis | Hundred Caves of Yoshimi | 36°02′24″N 139°25′17″E | 1 | 593 |
| Kamakura Kaidō Upper Route 鎌倉街道上道 Kamakura Kaidō kamitsu-michi | Moroyama | | | 35°24′31″N 139°28′40″E | 3, 6 | 00004162 |
| Sannōzuka Kofun 山王塚古墳 Sannōzuka kofun | Kawagoe | | Sannōzuka Kofun | 35°54′00″N 139°27′43″E | 1 | 00004174 |
| Minimamihiki Kiln Site 南比企窯跡 Minimamihiki kama ato | Hatoyama | | | 35°59′27″N 139°18′52″E | 6 | 00004175 |
| Dēnotame Site デーノタメ遺跡; Dēnotame iseki | Kitamoto | | | 36°00′57″N 139°32′08″E | | |

== Prefectural Historic Sites ==
As of 1 May 2024, one hundred and eighty-five Sites have been designated as being of prefectural importance.

| Site | Municipality | Comments | Image | Coordinates | Type | Ref. |
|---|---|---|---|---|---|---|
| Ayase Shell Mound 綾瀬貝塚; Ayase kaizuka | Hasuda | | | 36°00′46″N 139°38′41″E | | for all refs see |
| Ina Tadatsugu Grave 伊奈忠次墓; Ina Tadatsugu no haka | Kōnosu | at Shōgan-ji (勝願寺) | | 36°03′21″N 139°30′51″E | | |
| Shingō Shell Mound 新郷貝塚; Shingō kaizuka | Kawaguchi | | | 35°50′05″N 139°45′48″E | | |
| Eikōin Shell Mound 栄光院貝塚; Eikōin kaizuka | Matsubushi | | | 35°57′11″N 139°50′05″E | | |
| Minamoto Yoshikata Grave 源義賢墓; Minamoto Yoshikata no haka | Ranzan | | | 36°01′39″N 139°19′54″E | | |
| Nakayama Nobuyoshi Grave 中山信吉墓; Nakayama Nobuyoshi no haka | Hannō | at Chikan-ji (智観寺) | | 35°51′46″N 139°19′10″E | | |
| Kogaito Shell Mound 小貝戸貝塚; Kogaito kaizuka | Ina | | | 36°00′08″N 139°37′44″E | | |
| Hatakeyama Shigetada Grave 畠山重忠墓; Hatakeyama Shigetada no haka | Fukaya | at Imuku Jinja (井椋神社) | | 36°07′58″N 139°16′12″E | | |
| Okabe Rokuyata Tadazumi Grave 岡部六弥太忠澄墓; Okabe Rokuyata Tadazumi no haka | Fukaya | at Fusai-ji (普済寺) | | 36°12′32″N 139°15′05″E | | |
| Kuroiwa Cave Tombs 黒岩横穴墓群; Kuroiwa yokoana bo-gun | Yoshimi | | | 36°03′41″N 139°26′19″E | | |
| Taki-no Castle Site 滝の城跡; Taki-no-jō ato | Tokorozawa | | | 35°48′01″N 139°31′55″E | | |
| Kawagoe Castle Site 川越城跡; Kawagoe-jō ato | Kawagoe | | | 35°55′28″N 139°29′31″E | | |
| Iwatsuki Castle Site 岩槻城跡; Iwatsuki-jō ato | Saitama | | | 35°57′04″N 139°42′37″E | | |
| Ashikaga Masauji Residence Site and Grave 足利政氏館跡及び墓; Ashikaga Masauji tate ato oyobi haka | Kuki | in the grounds of Kantō-in (甘棠院) | | 36°04′26″N 139°40′07″E | | |
| Nikkō Onari Kaidō Ichirizuka 日光御成街道一里塚; Nikkō Onari Kaidō ichirizuka | Sugito | | | 36°03′02″N 139°42′03″E | | |
| Fujita Kasukuni Grave 藤田康邦墓付婦人西福御前墓; Fujita Kasukuni no haka tsuke fujin Saifuku Gozen no haka | Yorii | designation includes the tomb of his wife Saifuku Gozen; at Shōryū-ji (正龍寺) | | 36°07′24″N 139°10′57″E | | |
| Hōjō Ujikuni Grave 北条氏邦墓付婦人大福御前墓; Hōjō Ujikuni no haka tsuke fujin Daifuku Gozen no haka | Yorii | designation includes the tomb of his wife Daifuku Gozen; at Shōryū-ji (正龍寺) | | 36°07′24″N 139°10′57″E | | |
| Sueno Kiln Site 末野窯跡; Sueno kama ato | Yorii | | | 36°07′27″N 139°09′39″E | | |
| Ichirizuka 一里塚; Ichirizuka | Saitama | one ri north of Iwatsuki-juku Ichirizuka on the Nikkō Onari Kaidō | | | | |
| Ichirizuka 一里塚; Ichirizuka | Shiraoka | one ri north of Ainohara Ichirizuka on the Nikkō Onari Kaidō; both mounds survive | | | | |
| Ichirizuka 一里塚; Ichirizuka | Kōnosu | on the Nakasendō | | | | |
| Ichirizuka 一里塚; Ichirizuka | Gyōda | on the Kawagoe Shinobu Kaidō (川越忍街道) | | | | |
| Kōken-ji Stone Sutra Repository 広見寺石経蔵; Kōkenji seki kyōzō | Chichibu | | | 36°01′00″N 139°05′36″E | | |
| Kanpō Flood Control Stele 寛保治水碑; Kanpō chisui-hi | Kuki | | | 36°05′59″N 139°39′18″E | | |
| Ueda Tomonao Grave 上田朝直墓; Ueda Tomonao no haka | Higashichichibu | at Jōren-ji (浄蓮寺) | | 36°03′04″N 139°12′17″E | | |
| Shōbō-ji Six-Sided Pillar 正法寺六面幢; Shōbōji rokumen-hata | Higashimatsuyama | | | 36°00′07″N 139°21′54″E | | |
| Kinzō-in Hōkyōintō 金蔵院宝篋印塔; Kinzōin hōkyōintō | Yoshimi | | | 36°01′20″N 139°28′07″E | | |
| Tennōyamazuka 天王山塚; Tennōyamazuka | Shōbu | | | 36°02′21″N 139°34′29″E | | |
| Yamane Six-Sided Tō 山根六角塔; Yamane rokkaku-tō | Moroyama | | | 35°54′54″N 139°18′30″E | | |
| Ōshima Urin Site 大島有隣遺跡; Ōshima Urin iseki | Sugito | | | 36°02′53″N 139°43′12″E | | |
| Lime-Burning Site 石灰焼場跡; Sekkai yakiba ato | Hannō | | | 35°50′32″N 139°15′00″E | | |
| Kannon Rock Niche 観音窟石龕; Kannon iwaya sekigan | Hannō | | | 35°54′26″N 139°13′13″E | | |
| Ashikaga Mochiuji, Haruō, and Yasuō Memorial Tō 足利持氏、同春王、同安王供養塔; Ashikaga Mochiuji, dō-Haruō, dō-Yasuō kuyōtō | Kazo | | | 36°06′31″N 139°32′52″E | | |
| Kie Buttō 帰依仏塔; Kie Buttō | Matsubushi | | | 35°56′30″N 139°48′33″E | | |
| Ina Family Residence Site 伊奈氏屋敷跡; Ina-shi yashiki ato | Ina | | | 35°58′29″N 139°37′45″E | | |
| Hitomi Fortified Residence Site 人見館跡; Hitomi-yakata ato | Fukaya | | | 36°10′23″N 139°16′00″E | | |
| Mamuro Haniwa Kiln Site 馬室埴輪窯跡; Mamuro haniwa kama ato | Kōnosu | | | 36°02′08″N 139°30′26″E | | |
| Ōkura Fortified Residence Site 大蔵館跡; Ōkura-yakata ato | Ranzan | | | 36°01′39″N 139°19′45″E | | |
| Kōshō-in Six Jizō Tō 幸春院六地蔵塔; Kōshō-in roku Jizō tō | Kamikawa | | | 36°13′18″N 139°05′57″E | | |
| Ōdori Castle Site 青鳥城跡; Ōdori-jō ato | Higashimatsuyama | | | 36°01′52″N 139°22′38″E | | |
| Shūkutsu Rock Buddhas 鷲窟磨崖仏; Shūkutsu magaibutsu | Ogano | | | 36°02′28″N 138°57′14″E | | |
| Kanpō Flood Level Rock Stele 寛保洪水位磨崖標; Kanpō kōzui-i magaihyō | Nagatoro | | | 36°07′56″N 139°07′18″E | | |
| Beppu Clan Graves 別府氏墓; Beppu-shi haka | Kumagaya | at Anraku-ji (安楽寺) | | 36°11′24″N 139°20′18″E | | |
| Ueda Tomonao Stone Tōba 上田朝直建立青石塔婆; Ueda Tomonao konryū aoishi tōba | Higashimatsuyama | | | 36°02′05″N 139°24′21″E | | |
| Ryūkō-ji Stone Tōba 龍興寺青石塔婆; Ryūkōji aoishi tōba | Kazo | | | 36°06′31″N 139°32′52″E | | |
| Ryūha Zenshu Grave 龍派禅珠墓; Ryūha Zenshu no haka | Kawaguchi | at Chōtoku-ji (長徳寺) | | 35°50′30″N 139°41′26″E | | |
| Former Kitane Daikan Office 旧北根代官所 kyū-Kitane daikanjo | Fukaya | | | 36°08′43″N 139°15′09″E | | |
| Kijigaoka Castle Site 雉岡城跡; Kijigaoka-jō ato | Honjō | | | 36°11′35″N 139°07′40″E | | |
| Satte Stele of Righteous Relief from Poverty and Hunger 幸手義賑窮餓之碑; Satte gishin kyūga no ishibumi | Satte | after the 1783 Eruption of Mount Asama | | 36°04′54″N 139°43′15″E | | |
| Iwatsuki Domain Senkyōkan 岩槻藩遷喬館; Iwatsuki-han Senkyōkan | Saitama | | | 35°56′56″N 139°41′53″E | | |
| Ōdawara Kōsatsu Site 大達原高札場; Ōdawara takafuda-ba | Chichibu | | | 35°56′24″N 138°57′39″E | | |
| Motohashi Keisui Brush Mound 本橋渓水筆塚; Motohashi Keisui no fude-zuka | Hannō | at Kaji Jinja (加治神社) | | 35°51′51″N 139°19′26″E | | |
| Beppu Castle Site 別府城跡; Beppu-jō ato | Kumagaya | | | 36°11′16″N 139°20′37″E | | |
| So-called Minamoto no Tsunemoto Residence Site 伝源経基館跡 den-Minamoto no Tsunemoto yakata ato | Kōnosu | | | 36°03′31″N 139°30′02″E | | |
| Negoya Castle Site 根古屋城跡; Negoya-jō ato | Tokorozawa | | | 35°46′48″N 139°24′25″E | | |
| Kōgen Ittō-ryū Hemi Family Renbu Dōjō 甲源一刀流逸見氏練武道場; Kōgen ittō-ryū Hemi-shi renbu dōjō | Ogano | | | | | |
| Hachimanyama Kofun Stone Chamber 八幡山古墳石室; Hachimanyama kofun seki-shitsu | Gyōda | | | 36°08′35″N 139°29′12″E | | |
| Nobidome Irrigation Channel 野火止用水; Nobidome yōsui | Niiza | | | 35°46′55″N 139°33′06″E | | |
| Hōfun Ōtsuka Kofun 方墳大塚古墳; Hōfun Ōtsuka kofun | Saitama | | | 35°55′25″N 139°34′57″E | | |
| Enfun Ōtsuka Kofun 円墳大塚古墳; Enfun Ōtsuka kofun | Minano | | | 36°03′37″N 139°05′49″E | | |
| Raidenzuka Kofun 雷電塚古墳; Raidenzuka kofun | Sakado | | | 35°58′20″N 139°26′09″E | | |
| Ana-Hachiman Kofun 穴八幡古墳; Ana-Hachiman kofun | Ogawa | | | 36°03′19″N 139°14′58″E | | |
| Ishida Embankment 石田堤; Ishida tsutsumi | Gyōda | | | 36°07′43″N 139°28′42″E | | |
| Shōgunzuka Kofun 将軍塚古墳; Shōgunzuka kofun | Higashimatsuyama | | | 36°01′04″N 139°24′45″E | | |
| Shio Kofun Cluster 塩古墳群; Shio kofun-gun | Kumagaya | | | 36°06′02″N 139°18′59″E | | |
| Jizōzuka Kofun 地蔵塚古墳; Jizōzuka kofun | Gyōda | | | 36°08′52″N 139°29′13″E | | |
| Kashima Kofun Cluster 鹿島古墳群; Kashima kofun-gun | Fukaya | | | 36°08′01″N 139°18′23″E | | |
| Manaita-Takayama Kofun 真名板高山古墳; Manaita-Takayama kofun | Gyōda | | | 36°08′00″N 139°31′21″E | | |
| Nagasaka-Shōtenzuka Kofun 長坂聖天塚古墳; Nagasaka-Shōtenzuka kofun | Misato | | | 36°11′09″N 139°12′00″E | | |
| Iizuka-Maneki Kofun Cluster 飯塚・招木古墳群; Iizuka-Maneki kofun-gun | Chichibu | 124 burials | | 36°02′45″N 139°05′52″E | | |
| Kanasaki Kofun Cluster 金崎古墳群; Kanasaki kofun-gun | Minano | 4 burials | | 36°05′07″N 139°06′41″E | | |
| Tōkanyama Kofun とうかん山古墳; Tōkanyama kofun | Kumagaya | | | 36°05′14″N 139°24′43″E | | |
| Kabutoyama Kofun 甲山古墳; Kabutoyama kofun | Kumagaya | | | 36°04′43″N 139°24′24″E | | |
| Tenjinyama Cave Tombs 天神山横穴墓群; Tenjinyama ōketsu bo-gun | Namegawa | | | 36°05′46″N 139°21′30″E | | |
| Sagiyama Kofun 鷺山古墳; Sagiyama kofun | Honjō | | | 36°12′30″N 139°09′44″E | | |
| Hiiragizuka Kofun 柊塚古墳; Hiiragizuka kofun | Asaka | | | 35°48′34″N 139°36′21″E | | |
| Gongenyama Kofun Cluster 権現山古墳群; Gongenyama kofun-gun | Fujimino | 6 burials | | 35°52′49″N 139°31′39″E | | |
| Banbaomuroyama Site 馬場小室山遺跡; Banbaomuroyama iseki | Saitama | | | 35°53′10″N 139°41′04″E | | |
| Chichibu Family Residence Site 秩父氏館跡; Chichibu-shi yakata ato | Chichibu | | | 36°02′29″N 139°02′06″E | | |
| Akayama Castle Site 赤山城跡; Akayama-jō ato | Kawaguchi | | | 35°51′02″N 139°44′49″E | | |
| Warabi Castle Site 蕨城跡; Warabi-jō ato | Warabi | | | 35°49′36″N 139°40′53″E | | |

== Municipal Historic Sites ==
As of 1 May 2024, a further five hundred and eleven Sites have been designated as being of municipal importance.

== See also ==
- Cultural Properties of Japan
- Saitama Prefectural Museum of History and Folklore
- List of Places of Scenic Beauty of Japan (Saitama)
