= Hara kanga ruins =

Ancient ruins in Saitama, Kantō, Japan

Hara Kanga ruins
- 幡羅官衙遺跡群 (Japanese)
- Hara Kanga ruins Hara kanga ruins (Japan)
- 36°11′51″N 139°16′53″E
- Periods: Nara - Heian period
- Location: Kumagaya, Fukaya, Japan
- Region: Kantō region

History
- Built: 7th century AD
- Abandoned: 11th century AD

Site notes
- Public access: Yes (no public facilities)

The Hara Kanga ruins (幡羅官衙遺跡群, Hara kanga iseki gun) is an archaeological site with the ruins of a Nara to Heian period government administrative complex located in what is now the cities of Kumagaya and Fukaya in Saitama prefecture in the Kantō region of Japan. The site consists of the Hara kanga ruins (幡羅官衙遺跡), and the Nishi-Fuchibe Ritual Site ruins (西別府祭祀遺跡). The ruins were protected as a National Historic Site in 2018. After the Mirokuji kanga ruins in Gifu prefecture, it is the second example where the ritual complex was located together with the administrative site.

== Overview ==
In the late Nara period, after the establishment of a centralized government under the Ritsuryō system, local rule over the provinces was standardized under a kokufu (provincial capital), and each province was divided into smaller administrative districts, known as (郡, gun, kōri), composed of 2–20 townships in 715 AD. Each of the units had an administrative complex built on a semi-standardized layout based on contemporary Chinese design, and was often accompanied by a district temple, which was a smaller version of the provincial kokubun-ji temples.

=== Hara Kanga ruins ===
The site of the Hara Kanga was discovered in 2001, and per several archaeological excavations, the foundations for a cluster of raised-floor granaries for the storage of taxation rice have been discovered. As the area was used as farmland and had never been overbuilt, the state of preservation was found to be good. Excavations were made 35 times since 2001. Excavated relics include Haji ware, Sue ware, green glaze and ash glaze pottery, which were high-class tableware at that time, as well as roof tiles .The complex measured 500 meters from east-to-west by 400 meters from north-to-south and was in use from the latter half of the 7th century to the first half of the 11th century. A road with a width of eight meters ran through the middle of the complex, and the main government facilities were in the northwest quadrant of the compound. The foundations of stables for troops based at the complex, the site of a kitchen, and a building which appears to have been used as a banqueting hall have been discovered. A small remnant of the original moat which once surrounded the site also has survived on the grounds of the adjacent Yuden Jinja. However, the foundations of the actual administrative building have yet to be determined.

=== The Nishi-Fuchibe Ritual Site ruins ===
Adjacent to the Hara Hanga site is a Shinto shrine, the Yuden Jinja. Excavations within the precincts of this shrine indicate that it was used a ritual site until the end of the Heian period. The location of this shrine is at a spring, and numerous pottery votive offerings are left at this site with prayers for abundant water and for the well-being of county politics.

Just south of this shrine are the ruins of a Buddhist temple, which was part of the standard Kanga template. It appears to have been abandoned in the 9th century. It is estimated that the temple compound was 150 meters east-to-west and 200 meters north-to-south, and was surrounded by a moat with a width of about 5 meters. The layout of the temple's cathedral is unknown as the site has only partially been excavated, but one building with a platform foundation was confirmed. In addition, three pit-houses, including a small blacksmith workshop were found in the temple area, possibly to supply items such as nails for the temple's construction.

== See also ==
- List of Historic Sites of Japan (Saitama)
