= Minimamihiki Kiln Site =

Minamihiki Kiln Sites
- 南比企窯跡群 (Japanese)
- Minamihiki Kiln SitesSite Minimamihiki Kiln Site (Japan)
- Interactive map of Minamihiki Kiln Sites
- 35°59′27″N 139°18′52″E
- Periods: Nara period
- Location: Hatoyama, Saitama Japan
- Region: Kanto region

Site notes
- Public access: No

The Minamihiki Kiln Sites (南比企窯跡群, Minimamihiki kama ato) is a collective name for several archaeological sites with the ruins of mid-Nara period Sue ware kilns and production sites distributed across the hills in the southern part of the neighborhood of Arashiyama and the eastern part of the town of Tokigawa, and centered around the town Hatoyama in Hiki District, Saitama, Japan as well as parts of the city of Higashimatsuyama. These kilns produced both earthenware and roof tiles from the early 6th century to the early 10th century. Over 57 subgroups of kiln sites have been confirmed, with a total of several hundred kilns. Portions of the sites have been collectively designated as a National Historic Site, in 2023.

== Overview ==
Sue pottery is believed to have originated in the 5th or 6th century in the Kaya region of southern Korea, and was brought to Japan by immigrant craftsmen in the late Kofun period to the Asuka period. It was produced in many locations around Japan by the 8th century, around the time of the founding of kokubunji national temple system in 741.

The main group is the Minamihiki Kiln Sites is the Hatoyama Kiln Group, where 50 kiln ruins, 150 pit dwellings with pottery wheel pits and 561 clay pits were discovered during the construction of a golf course in the Akanuma Hiromachi neighborhood of Hatoyama. Archaeological excavations were carried out from 1984 to 1985. The artisan settlements consisted of a groups of two or three houses adjacent to the kilns, and it is estimated that there were seven or eight groups in the heyday. Roof tiles for temples in the northern Musashi region, including tiles for the Musashi Kokubun-ji (40 kilometers to the south) were made at these kilns, and earthenware from these kilns was supplied as far as Sagami Province (present-day Kanagawa Prefecture) and Shimōsa Province (present-day Chiba Prefecture), as Sue ware became more popular among the general farming class, production increased, supplanting the earlier Haji ware.

The earliest kilns appeared the early 6th century in the eastern foothills of Higashimatsuyama, and by the late 7th century, kilns producing roof tiles and Sue ware appeared at the Ishida, Shinnuma and Akanuma ancient tile kiln sites in Hatoyama.The Shinnuma kiln site was the largest in Japan at the time, with 26 kilns, and produced tiles for Musashi Kokubun-ji in the mid-8th century to the Heian period. Later, in the 9th century, production in Hatoyama declined, and production was shifted to Shogunzawa in Arashiyama and Kamenohara in Tokigawa, where roof tiles and Sue ware from the time of the Heian period reconstruction of Musashi Kokubun-ji began to be produced. The Shinnuma Kiln Site was re-discovered in the Edo period, and a full-scale excavation was carried out by Rissho University in 1959. A large variety of tiles were unearthed during the excavation, ordinary tiles, flat-sided tiles, and round-sided tiles as well as onigawara. The Kamenohara Kiln Site was confirmed to have more than seven kilns in two branches. The Shogunzawa Kiln Site was a group of more than 40 kilns in six branches, centered in the Shogunzawa area of the town of Arashiyama.

The kilns were semi-underground, stepless noborigama climbing kilns, with a kiln floor with a slope of about 20°. Gravel, broken pieces of pottery, and failed Sue ware bowls were placed face down and hardened with clay to keep the vessels to be fired horizontal as a kiln platform. The characteristic of the clay of the Sue ware produced in the Minamihiki kiln site group is that it contains sand grains such as quartz and pyroxene, and is coarse and dense. Fossils of sponge bone needles contained in the clay that rise to the surface during firing, forming white needle-like patterns, distinguish the products from other kiln sites.

Most of the sites are located on private property, and there is no public access.

== See also ==
- List of Historic Sites of Japan (Saitama)
