= Shinpukuji shell mound =

Archaeological site

- 真福寺貝塚 (Japanese)
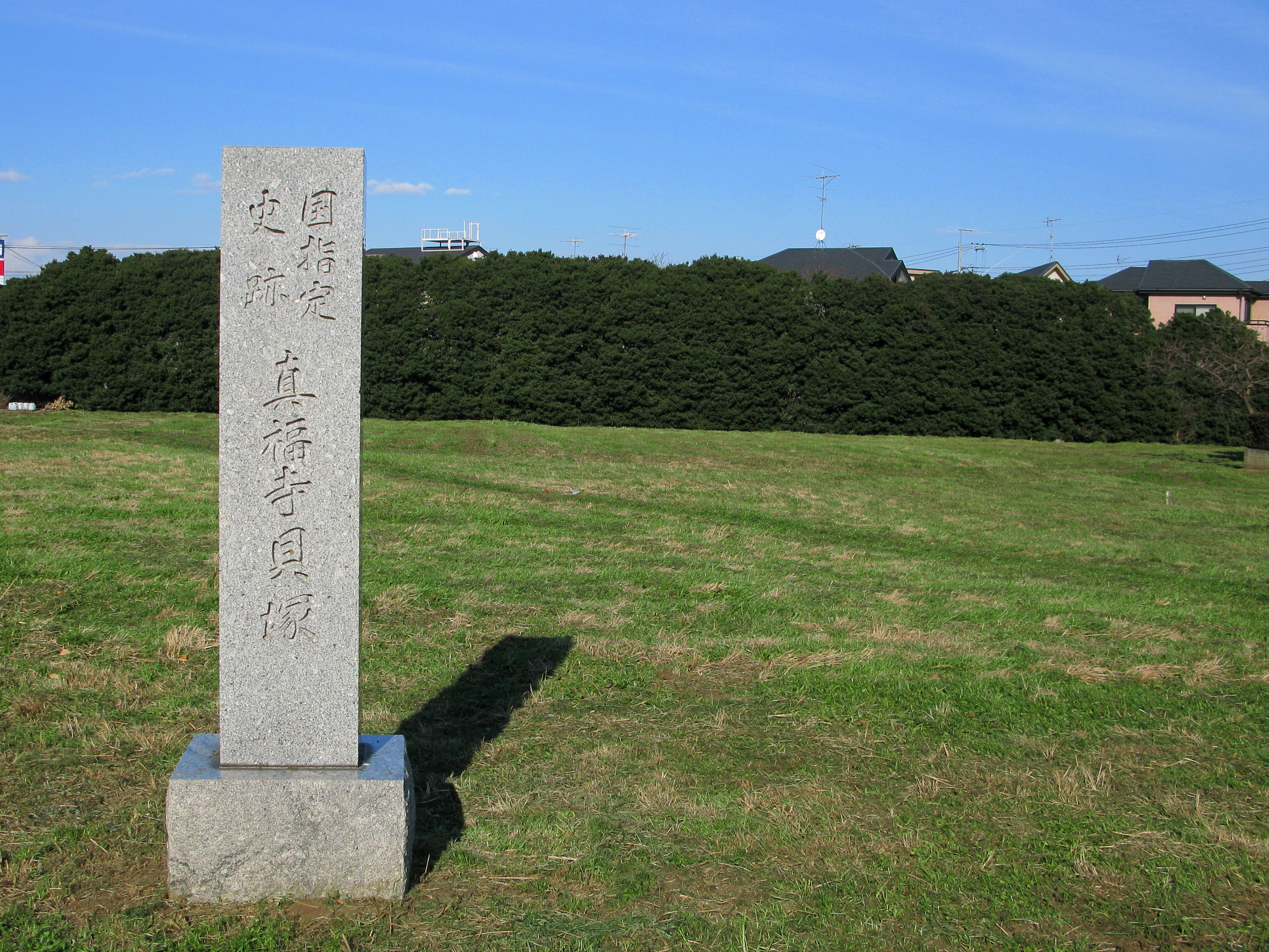
- Shinpukuji shell mound

- Shinpukuji shell mound Shinpukuji shell mound (Japan)
- 35°56′26″N 139°42′24″E
- Type: shell midden, settlement
- Periods: late Jōmon period
- Location: Saitama, Saitama, Japan
- Region: Kantō region

Site notes
- Area: 24,800 m^{2} (267,000 sq ft)
- Public access: Yes (no public facilities)

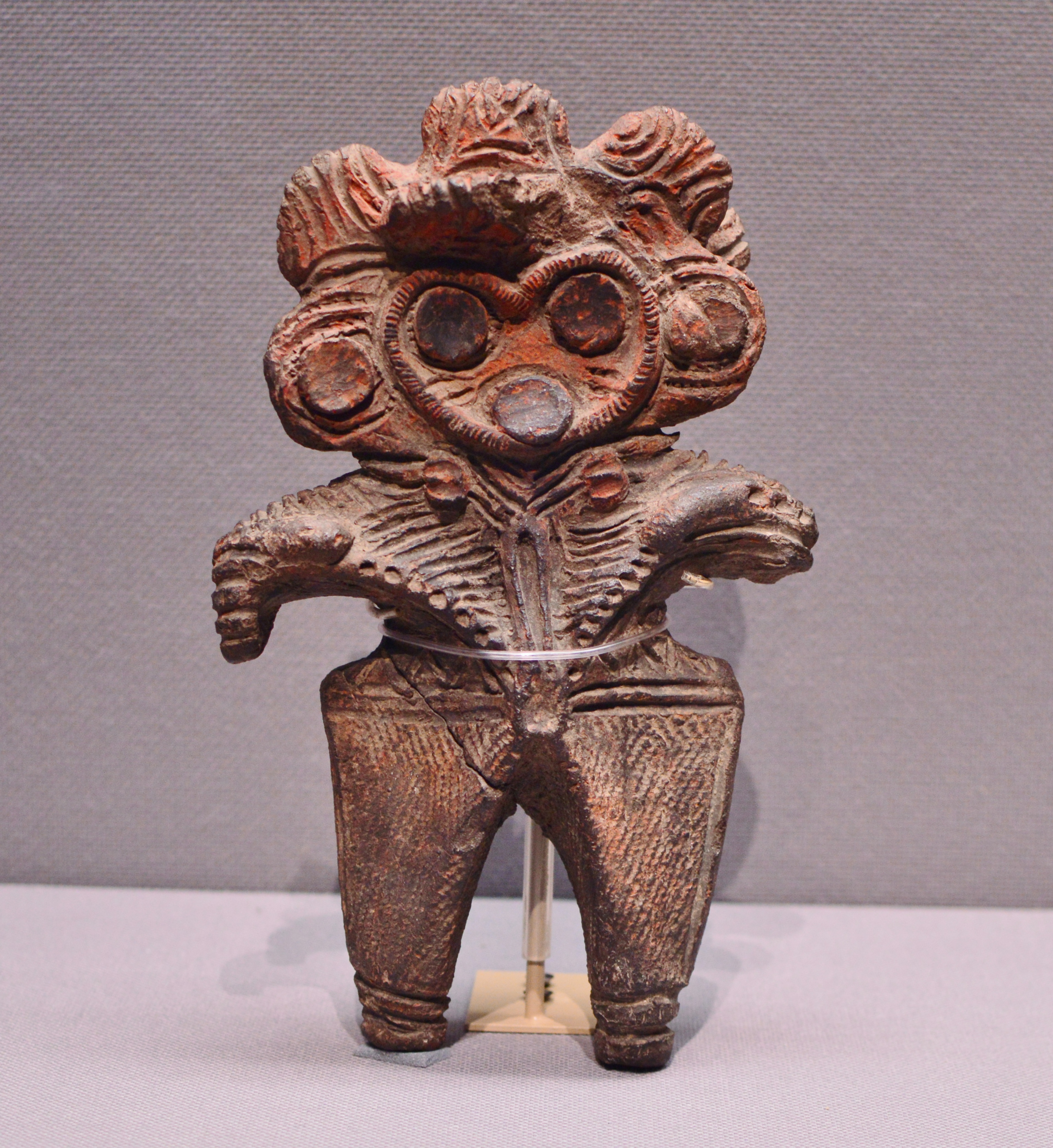
Dogū found at the Shinpukuji shell midden

The Shinpukuji shell mound (真福寺貝塚, Shinpukuji kaizuka) is an archaeological site in the Iwatsuki neighborhood of the city of Saitama, Saitama Prefecture, in the Kantō region of Japan containing a late Jōmon period shell midden and settlement ruin. The site was designated a National Historic Site of Japan in 1975, with the borders extended in 2002 and again in 2016.

== Overview ==
During the early to middle Jōmon period (approximately 4000 to 2500 BC), sea levels were five to six meters higher than at present, and the ambient temperature was also 2 deg C higher. During this period, the Kantō region was inhabited by the Jōmon people, many of whom lived in coastal settlements. The middens associated with such settlements contain bone, botanical material, mollusc shells, sherds, lithics, and other artifacts and ecofacts associated with the now-vanished inhabitants, and these features, provide a useful source into the diets and habits of Jōmon society. Most of these middens are found along the Pacific coast of Japan.

The site is located on a tongue-shaped plateau with an elevation of about 10 to 13 meters above the present day sea level in the Omiya Plateau in the eastern part of Saitama. Although the area is now a considerable distance inland from the coast of Tokyo Bay, during the late to final Jōmon period it was a peninsula in an area of peat swamps near the Ayase River on a long inlet of the sea. The midden is a shell ring with a diameter of 150 meters. It was first excavated in the 1920s, during which times the foundations for many pit dwellings were discovered, along with clay figurines, Jōmon pottery, magatama, polished stones, and tools made of stone or animal bone were discovered. Of especial note was a 16-cm owl-shaped dogū clay figurine which was found almost intact, and which was subsequently designated a National Important Cultural Property.

The peat layer of the midden preserved chestnuts, walnuts, buckwheat, horse chestnuts and gourd seeds, shedding further light on the diet of the inhabitants. In 1934, it was proposed that this be designated a type site for a distinctive design of earthenware discovered. Further excavations were conducted in 1940 by Tokyo Imperial University and in 1965 by Keio University and in 1988 by former Iwatsuki City.

The site is a five-minute walk from the "Moto Asama" bus stop from Tōbu Noda Line Iwatsuki Station. The site was backfilled after excavation and is now an empty field.

== See also ==
- List of Historic Sites of Japan (Saitama)
