= Shimozato-Aoyama Stele Production Site =

Shimozato-Aoyama Stele Production Sites
- 下里・青山板碑製作遺跡 (Japanese)
- Shimozato-Aoyama Stele Production Sites Shimozato-Aoyama Stele Production Site (Japan)
- 36°03′24″N 139°15′42″E
- Type: Industrial site
- Periods: Kamakura to Muromachi period
- Location: Ogawa, Saitama, Japan
- Region: Kantō region

Site notes
- Public access: Yes (no public facilities)
- National Historic Site of Japan

The Shimozato-Aoyama Stele Production Sites (下里・青山板碑製作遺跡, Shimozato-Aoyama itabi seiskau iseki) are archaeological sites that contain the remnants of stone quarrying and production facilities for itabi stone stele from the Kamaura through Muromachi period, located in the Shimozato and Aoyama neighborhoods of Ogawa, Saitama, in the Kantō region of Japan. The site was designated a National Historic Site of Japan in 2020.

== Overview ==
Itabi is a form of stone pagoda that is shaped like a long, thin stone plank, often with a triangular top. The flat surface is divided into sections, on which are typically carved a single bonji character representing a Buddha or Bodhisattva and a verse or prayer corresponding to the worship of that deity. The monument typically has a date, and also the name of the person to whom it is dedicated, and sometimes the name or names of the person who dedicated the monument. The itabi were made mainly by samurai as either a memorial commemorating the dead, or a votive offering to pray for their own afterlife. These monuments began to appear in the 13th century and disappear for unknown reasons by the end of the 16th century.

The oldest known and dated itabi is a Amitada triad itabi found in Kumagaya, Saitama Prefecture, which was inscribed in 1227. Itabi were made in various parts of Japan; in the Kantō region, the main ones are the Musashi-type itabi made of chlorite schist, also known as "aoishi". More than 50,000 itabi made of aoishi have been confirmed, mainly in the Kantō region, of which 27,000 are located in Saitama Prefecture and 1000 are to be found in the town of Ogawa.

Chlorite schist, commonly known as "blue stone", has been prized since antiquity for its color and ease of processing. It has a well-developed crystalline structure that facilitates peeling off in thin sheets. In the Jomon period, it was used for stone tools and as a paving stone for pit dwellings, and in the Kofun period as a material for the burial chambers of ancient tumuli. In the town of Ogawa, it is often found in tombstones, stone walls, stone steps, retaining walls, waterway revetments, and as garden stones.

Ogawa was known to be a mining site for chlorite schist, but was never investigated as an archaeological site until reported to academia in 2001, with both finished and unfinished itabi discovered in 2007. The Ogawa Town Board of Education has been conducting excavations and surveys since 2012. A total of 19 mining sites in the Shimozato and Aoyama neighborhoods have been identified, three of which (Wariya, Nishizaka Shimo-mae A, and Uchikanzawa) received National Historic Site protection in 2014. Each of these sites has outcrops of blue stone, a large amount of shavings, microtopography (valleys and depressions) derived from the mining traces and a number of unfinished itabi, indicating that these were not only quarries for raw material, but were also production sites for itabi. Some of the unfinished itabi monuments have the trimmed surfaces, but no inscriptions, and it is assumed that the inscription and final decoration of these monuments took place at other locations once the monuments were sold. The unfinished itabi found at these locations are small, ranging from 12 to 22.5 cm in width, and comparable in size and shape to dated itabi from the middle of the 14th century to the latter half of the 15th century, which was the heyday of the itabi in the Kantō region.

== See also ==
- List of Historic Sites of Japan (Saitama)
