= Dēnotame Site =

- デーノタメ遺跡 (Japanese)
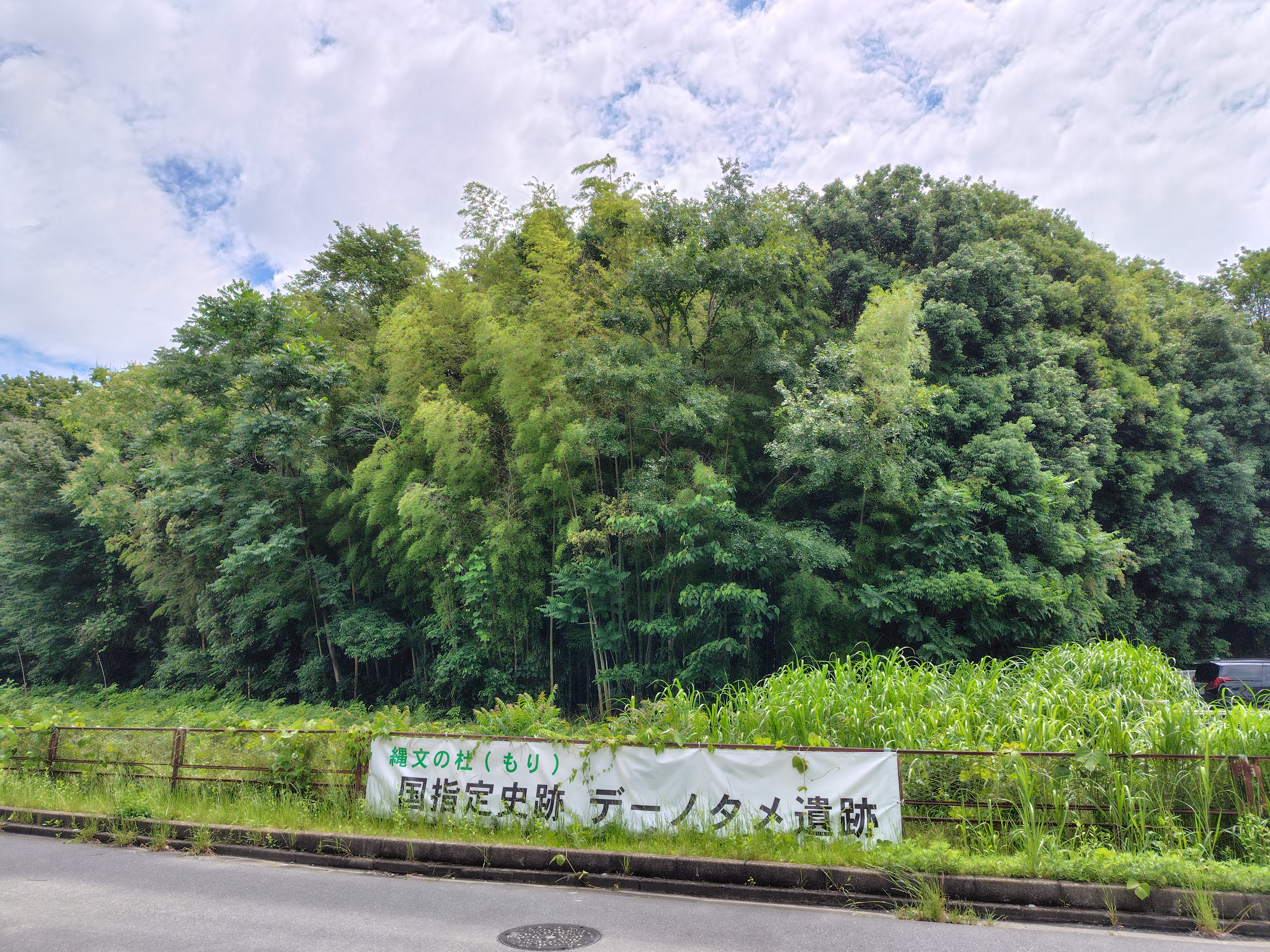
- Dēnotame site

- Location in Japan Dēnotame Site (Japan)
- 36°00′57.4″N 139°32′08.0″E
- Type: settlement trace
- Periods: Jōmon period
- Location: Kitamoto, Saitama, Japan
- Region: Kantō region

Site notes
- Elevation: 20 m (66 ft)
- Excavation dates: 2001-2009
- Public access: No facilities
- National Historic Site of Japan

Dēnotame Site (デーノタメ遺跡, Dēnotame iseki) is an archaeological site consisting of a middle to late Jōmon period (approximately 5000 to 3800 years ago) settlement trace located in what is now the Shimoishito Shimoji neighborhood of the city of Kitamoto, Saitama Prefecture in the Kantō region of Japan. It has been protected by the central government as a National Historic Site since 2024.

== Overview ==
The Dēnotame site, spanning four hectares around the Egawa River, encompasses the Middle and Late Jōmon periods, extending into the Yayoi and Kofun periods. The site was discovered in 1969 during an investigation of Denotame Pond in connection with the Kubo Land Readjustment Project, but was not excavated until 2001-2009. Numerous artifacts were subsequently unearthed, and in 2016, it was determined to be one of the largest circular settlements in the Kantō region, with a diameter of 210 meters. The remains of 25 pit dwellings have been discovered. The abundant groundwater, allowing for the preservation of many artifacts underground. Six "walnut middens" containing walnut shells have been discovered, as well as traces of horse chestnut and Japanese chestnut trees, whose nuts are edible. Lacquer wood and pollen, jade products, Jōmon pottery with soybeans and Adzuki beans embedded in or on its surface, elderberry and mulberry grains, and the carcasses of Japanese dung beetles have also been discovered. These findings suggest that the villagers adapted the forest vegetation to better secure food supplies.

The Dēnotame Site is approximately 2.1 kilometers southeast of Kitamoto Station on the JR East Takasaki Line.

== See also ==
- List of Historic Sites of Japan (Saitama)
