= Mizuko Shell Mound =

Mizuko Shell Midden
- 水子貝塚 (Japanese)
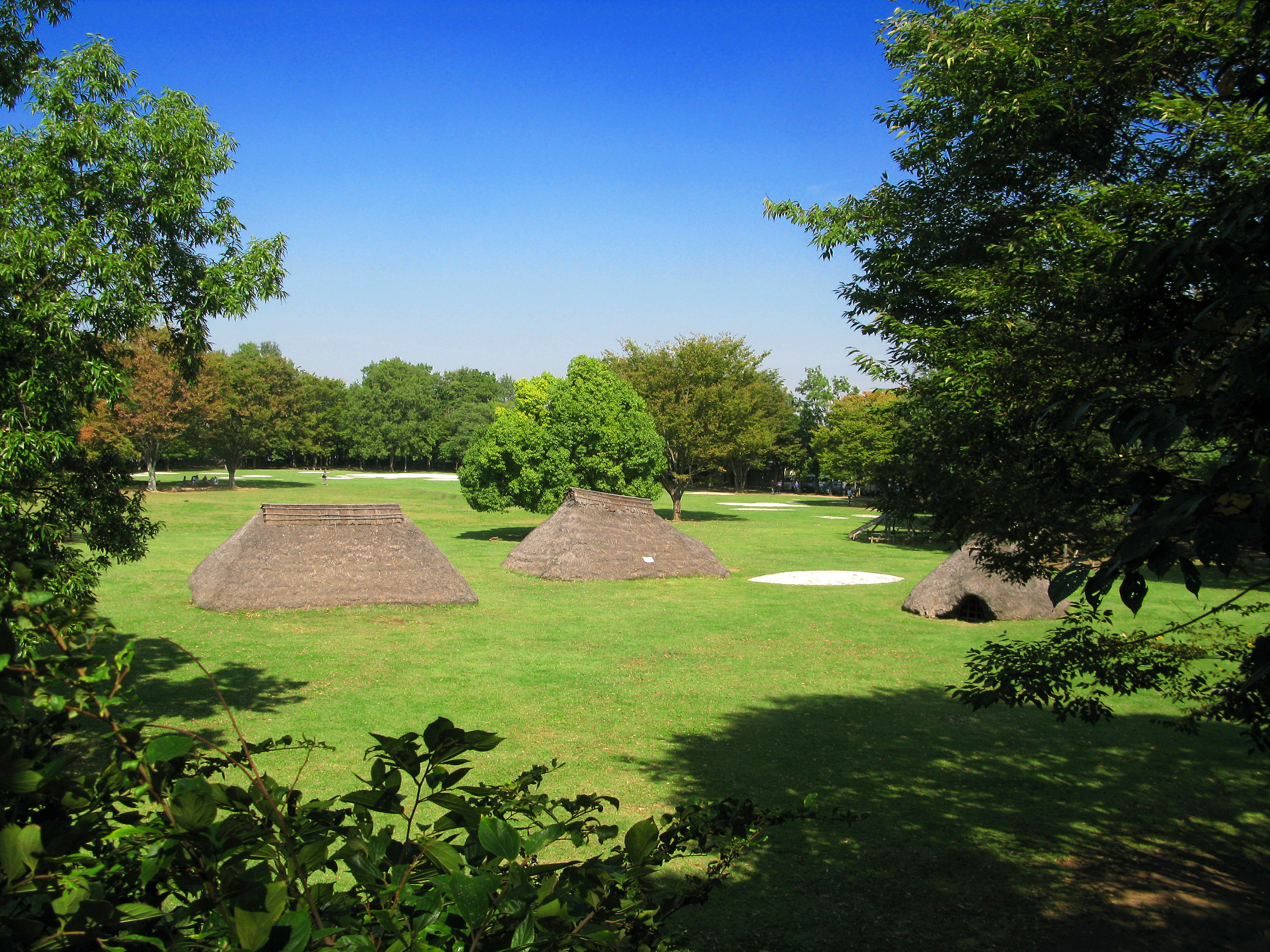
- Mizuko Shell Midden

- Mizuko Shell Midden Mizuko Shell Mound (Japan)
- 35°50′44″N 139°33′40″E
- Type: shell midden, settlement
- Periods: early Jōmon period
- Location: Fujimi, Saitama, Japan
- Region: Kantō region

Site notes
- Public access: Yes (park and museum)

The Mizuko Shell Midden (水子貝塚, Mizuko kaizuka) is an archaeological site in the Mizuko neighborhood of the city of Fujimi, Saitama Prefecture, in the Kantō region of Japan containing am early Jōmon period shell midden and settlement ruin. The site was designated a National Historic Site of Japan in 1969.

== Overview ==
During the early to middle Jōmon period (approximately 4000 to 2500 BC), sea levels were five to six meters higher than at present, and the ambient temperature was also 2 deg C higher. During this period, the Kantō region was inhabited by the Jōmon people, many of whom lived in coastal settlements. The middens associated with such settlements contain bone, botanical material, mollusc shells, sherds, lithics, and other artifacts and ecofacts associated with the now-vanished inhabitants, and these features, provide a useful source into the diets and habits of Jōmon society. Most of these middens are found along the Pacific coast of Japan.

The Mizuko Shell Midden is located at the eastern end of the Kawagoe Plateau, which is surrounded by the Shingashi River and the Iruma River, in the northern part of the Musashino Plateau in the western part of the Kantō Plain. Although the area is now a considerable distance inland from the coast of Tokyo Bay, during the Jōmon period it was a peninsula on a long inlet of the sea. The shell mound was discovered in 1917. In subsequent surveys, including an archaeological excavation conducted in 1978, it was determined that the midden was a shell ring with a diameter of 160 meters, consisting of 67 smaller shell middens. Each mound consisted primarily of fresh and brackish water shellfish (Yamato-shjimi), and were built on top of the sites of pit dwellings. It is a type site for a unique style of Jōmon pottery called the "Mizuko-type pottery".

In 1994, the site was opened to the public as the Mizuko Kaizuka Park (水子貝塚公園) with a small museum and reconstructions of pit dwellings. It is located approximately 20 minutes on foot from Mizuhodai Station on the Tōbu Tōjō Line.

== See also ==
- List of Historic Sites of Japan (Saitama)
