= Ōya Tile Kiln =

Archeological site in Japan

Ōya Tile Kiln ruins
- 大谷瓦窯跡 (Japanese)
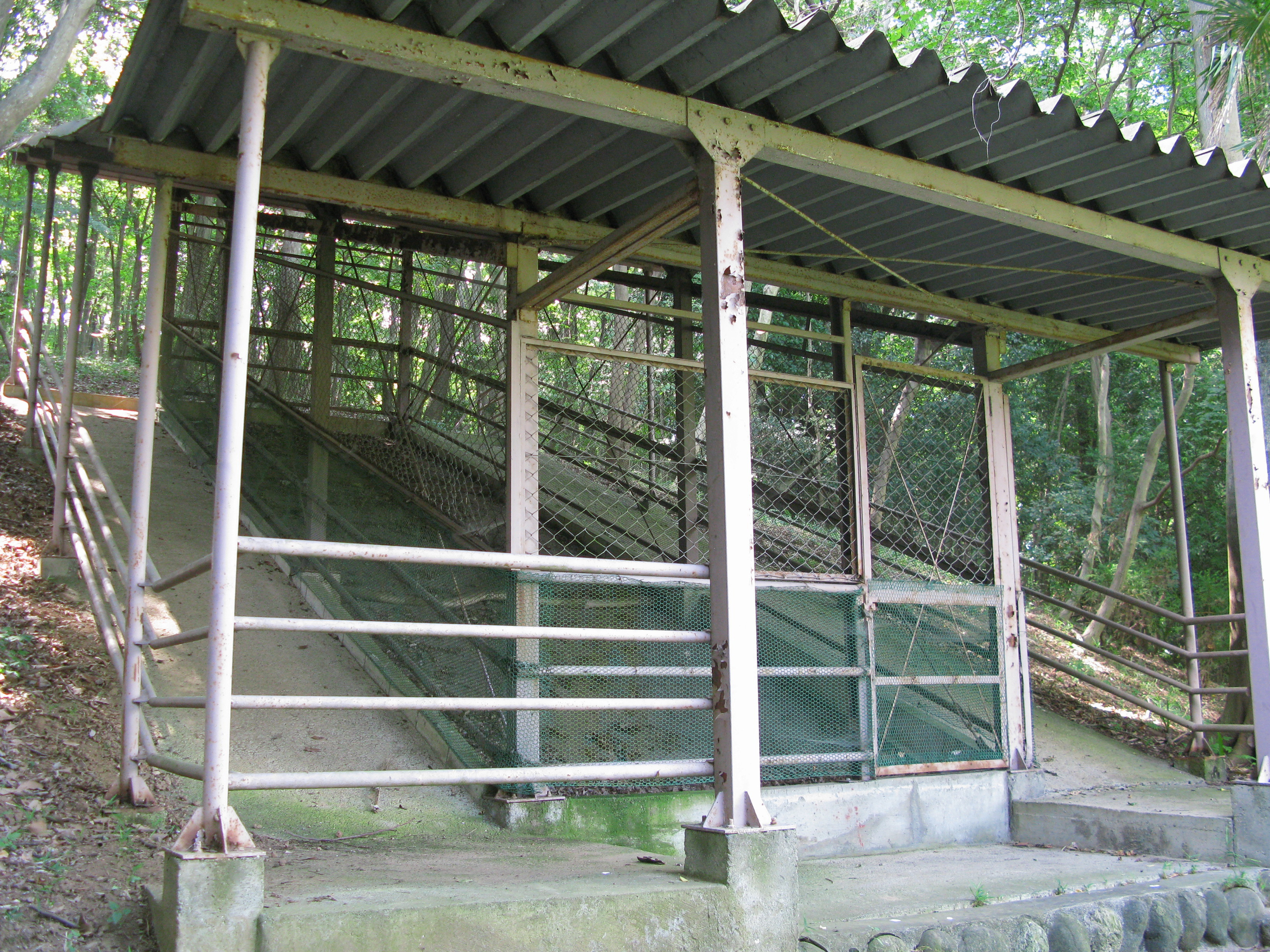
- Ōya Tile Kiln ruins

- Ōya Tile Kiln ruins Ōya Tile Kiln (Japan)
- 36°04′16″N 139°09′45″E
- Periods: Hakuho period
- Location: Higashimatsuyama, Saitama, Japan
- Region: Kantō region

Site notes
- Public access: Yes (public park)

The Ōya Tile Kiln ruins (大谷瓦窯跡, Ōya kawara kama ato) is an archaeological site with the ruins of a Hakuho period kiln, located in the Ōya neighborhood of the city of Higashimatsuyama, Saitama Prefecture in the Kantō region of Japan. It was designated a National Historic Site of Japan in 1931.

== Overview ==
Kawara (瓦) roof tiles made of fired clay were introduced to Japan from Baekche during the 6th century along with Buddhism. During the 570s under the reign of Emperor Bidatsu, the king of Baekche sent six people to Japan skilled in various aspects of Buddhism, including a temple architect. Initially, tiled roofs were a sign of great wealth and prestige, and used for temple and government buildings. The material had the advantages of great strength and durability, and could also be made at locations around the country wherever clay was available.

The Ōya site is located on the southeastern slope of a hill in the northern part of the city of Higashmatsuyama. Discovered in 1955, two kilns were found during an excavation survey, lined up at a distance of about 50 meters. One was relatively well-preserved, and although it had lost its ceiling, the firing box was intact. The length of the kiln was about 7.6 meters, and was about 1.1 meters wide at the center. The kilns a noborigama-type kiln in 13 steps, with flat tiles fixed to the upper edges and walls of each step. This type of flat tile is also used at the top of the south wall of the kiln and at the entrance to the firing box. Unearthed relics include eaves tiles, flat tiles, round tiles, and letter tiles, which were dated to the Hakuho period.

== See also ==
- List of Historic Sites of Japan (Saitama)
