= Shinmei Shell Mound =

Archaeological site

Shinmei Shell Midden
- 神明貝塚 (Japanese)
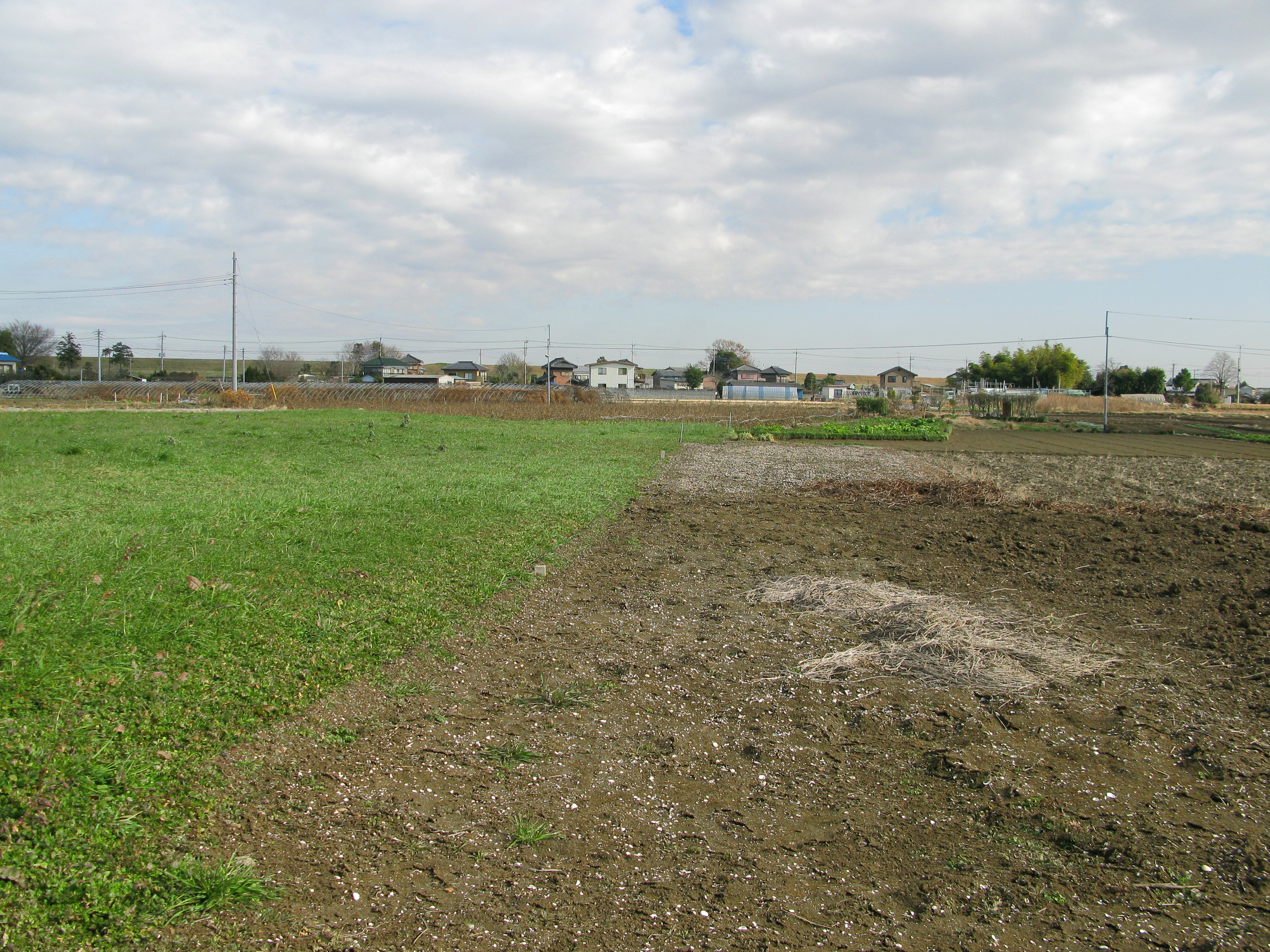
- Shinmei Shell Midden

- Mizuko Shell Midden Shinmei Shell Mound (Japan)
- 36°02′16″N 139°48′21″E
- Type: shell midden, settlement
- Periods: early Jōmon period
- Location: Kasukabe, Saitama, Japan
- Region: Kantō region

Site notes
- Public access: Yes (park and museum)
- National Special Historic Site of Japan

The Shinmei Shell Midden (神明貝塚, Shinmei kaizuka) is an archaeological site in the Nishioyanoi neighborhood of the city of Kasukabe, Saitama Prefecture, in the Kantō region of Japan containing am early Jōmon period shell midden and settlement ruin. The site was designated a National Historic Site of Japan in 2020.

== Overview ==
During the early to middle Jōmon period (approximately 4000 to 2500 BC), sea levels were five to six meters higher than at present, and the ambient temperature was also 2 deg C higher. During this period, the Kantō region was inhabited by the Jōmon people, many of whom lived in coastal settlements. The middens associated with such settlements contain bone, botanical material, mollusc shells, sherds, lithics, and other artifacts and ecofacts associated with the now-vanished inhabitants, and these features, provide a useful source into the diets and habits of Jōmon society. Most of these middens are found along the Pacific coast of Japan.

The Shinmei Shell Midden is located at the northernmost end of Kasukabe city. Although the area is now a considerable distance inland from the coast of Tokyo Bay, during the Jōmon period it was a peninsula on a long inlet of the sea. The shell mound extends for approximately 180 meters east-to-west by 120 meters north-to-south and consists mostly of yamato shijimi clam shells. It was first excavated in 1961 at which time the foundations of four pit dwellings were also discovered, as well as Kasori-type and Horinouchi-type Jōmon pottery. A second excavation made in 1965 found a number of human remains. The site was endangered in 2002 due to road construction, leading to its protection as a Saitama Prefecture Historic Site. Subsequently, excavation have been conducted annually since 2009. More human remains were found in 2016.

== See also ==
- List of Historic Sites of Japan (Saitama)
