= Minamikawara Stele =

Minamikawara ishitōba
- 南河原石塔婆 (Japanese)
- Minamikawara ishitōba Minamikawara Stele (Japan)
- 36°10′48″N 139°25′30″E
- Type: stele
- Periods: Kamakura period
- Location: Gyōda, Saitama, Japan
- Region: Kantō region

Site notes
- Public access: Yes

Minamikawara ishitōba (南河原石塔婆) is a pair of Kamakura period stone memorial monuments located in the city of Gyōda, Saitama Prefecture, in the Kantō region of Japan. These stelae were designated a National Historic Site in 1928.

== Overview ==
An Itabi (板碑), also known as a Tōba (塔婆) or Ishitōba (石塔婆) is a type of pagoda or stupa in pre-modern Japanese Buddhism. These were flat stone stelae in various materials and shapes, but typically made from granite or blue-grey schist with a flattened surface and a flat, triangular or pyramidal shaped top, which is separated from the body by a pair of engraved grooves. The flattened area provided a surface which was engraved with Buddhist texts, symbols and/or bas-reliefs carvings. Common motifs included Sanskrit characters in a circle above a lotus decoration, poetic and religious texts, the date of commemoration, and information about the builder and the reason for the creation of the monument. These stelae were typically 40-60 centimeters wide by up to two meters in height. These monuments were used in medieval Buddhism from the early 13th century (Kamakura period) to the 17th century (end of the Sengoku period) and were most common in the Kantō region of Japan. Their origin is obscure and no clear reason for their abrupt cessation is known.

The Minamikawara Ishitōba are located in northeastern part of the prefecture, on the border with Gunma prefecture, within the precincts of a Shingon Buddhist temple named Kampuku-ji. Per Edo period records, these stelae were discovered in a field north of the village and were relocated to this site at a later date. Per the late Edo period Shinpen Musashi Fudokikō (新編武蔵風土記稿), these moments were made to commemorate the local samurai Kawahara Takanao and his youngest brother Kawahara Morinao, who were killed at the Battle of Ikuta-no-Mori in Settsu Province during the Genpei War (1180–1185).

One stele is dated 1261 has a deep inscription with the Sanskrit symbol for Amida Nyōrai above a lotus motif in its upper half, and a line engraving depicting the Amida Sanzon on its lower half, together with the names of twelve people, presumably the donors who contributed to the construction of this monument for transfer of merit and prayers for the souls of the decease. The monument has a height of 2.63 meters (including the base) by 65 centimeters high by nine centimeters thick.

The second stele is dated 1265 is engraved with an outline image of Jizō Bosatsu seated on a stone throne, with the date and twenty names listed in the lower portion. The monument has a height of 1.87 meters (including the base) by 58 centimeters high by 6.5 centimeters thick.

The stelae are located a 10-minute walk from the "Kawara Jinja" stop on the Kokusai Juo Bus from Kumagaya Station on the JR East Takasaki Line.

== See also ==
- List of Historic Sites of Japan (Saitama)
