= Nogamishimogō Stele =

Stone memorial monument

- 野上下郷石塔婆 (Japanese)
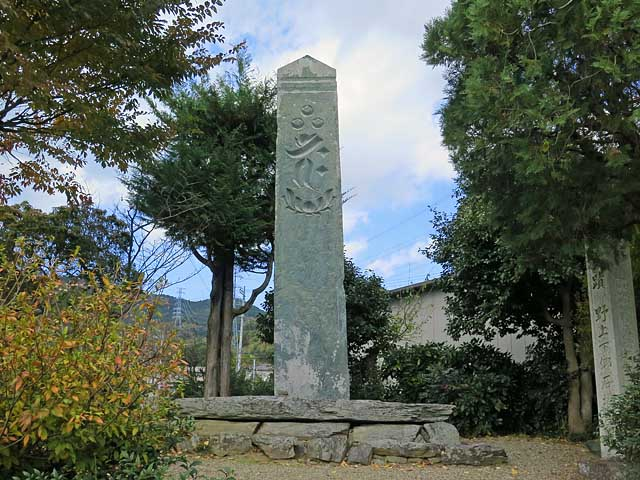
- Nogamishimogō ishitōba

- Nogamishimogō Stele Nogamishimogō Stele (Japan)
- 36°8′2.5″N 139°7′40″E
- Type: stele
- Periods: Muromachi period
- Location: Nagatoro, Saitama, Japan
- Region: Kantō region

Site notes
- Public access: Yes

Nogamishimogō ishitōba (野上下郷石塔婆) is a stone memorial monument located discovered in the Nogamishimo hamlet of the town of Nagatoro, Saitama Prefecture, in the Kantō region of Japan. The stele was designated a National Historic Site of Japan in 1928. It is then largest of its kind in Japan.

== Overview ==
An Itabi (板碑), also known as a Tōba (塔婆) or Ishitōba (石塔婆) is a type of pagoda or stupa in pre-modern Japanese Buddhism. These were flat stone stelae in various materials and shapes, but typically made from granite or blue-grey schist with a flattened surface and a flat, triangular or pyramidal shaped top, which is separated from the body by a pair of engraved grooves. The flattened area provided a surface which was engraved with Buddhist texts, symbols and/or bas-reliefs carvings. Common motifs included Sanskrit characters in a circle above a lotus decoration, poetic and religious texts, the date of commemoration, and information about the builder and the reason for the creation of the monument. These stelae were typically 40-60 centimeters wide by up to two meters in height. These monuments were used in medieval Buddhism from the early 13th century (Kamakura period) to the 17th century (end of the Sengoku period) and were most common in the Kantō region of Japan. Their origin is obscure and no clear reason for their abrupt cessation is known.

The Nogamishimogō Ishitōba is made of schist with a height of 5.37 meters, maximum width of 1.2 meters and thickness of 12 centimeters. It is standing on a pedestal made of the same stone. It is inscribed with the Sanskrit symbol for Shaka Nyōrai followed by four lines of the Mantra of Light, an important mantra of the Shingon and Kegon sects of Japanese Buddhism. The lower portion gives the date of October 1369, using the nengō of Ōan, which was a nengō of the Northern Court during the Nanboku-chō period, along with a statement that the stele was a work for transfer of merit and prayers for the soul of the castellan of Nakayama Castle, Ani Kazunao, as erected by his widow Myōen-ni.

This stone monument was moved to the current location when Japan National Route 140 was constructed in 1892. It is located approximately seven minutes on foot from Higuchi Station on the Chichibu Railway Chichibu Main Line.

== See also ==
- List of Historic Sites of Japan (Saitama)
