= Kawagoekan =

Building in Kawagoe, Saitama Prefecture, Japan

- 河越館
- Kawagoe, Saitama Prefecture, Japan
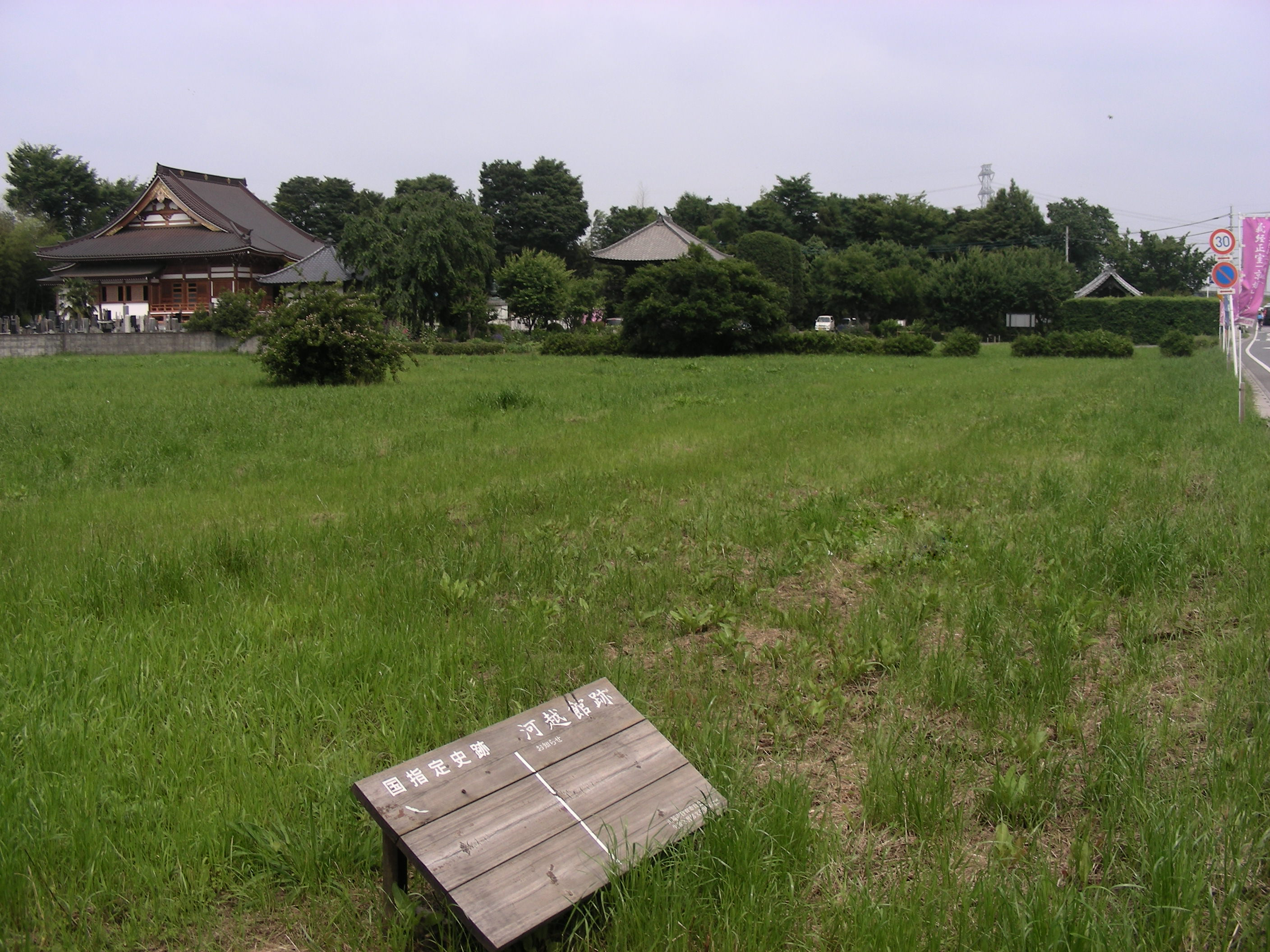
- Site of Kawagoekan

Site information
- Type: hirayama-style Japanese castle
- Open to the public: no (No public facilities)
- Condition: ruins

Location
- Kawagoekan Kawagoekan (Japan)
- Coordinates: 35°55′50″N 139°27′04″E

Site history
- Built: Heian period
- Built by: Kawagoe clan
- In use: Heian period through Sengoku period
- Demolished: 1590

The Kawagoekan (河越館) was a hirayama-style Heian period Japanese castle located in the Uwado neighborhood of what is now the city of Kawagoe, Saitama Prefecture, in the Kantō region of Japan. The ruins been protected as a National Historic Site since 1984.

== Background ==
More of a fortified residence than a true castle, the Kawagoekan occupied a square site 218 meters on each side, on the west bank of the Iruma River in the northwestern part of what is now Kawagoe city. The Kawagoe clan was a cadet house of the Chichibu clan, who were one of the Eight Great Heike Clans of the Kantō region from the late Heian period and the Kawagoekan was the center of a shōen which the clan had developed in the area. This shōen was "gifted" by the clan to Emperor Go-Shirakawa in exchange for court rankings and tax exemptions. The Kawagoe clan later served in influential roles within the Kamakura Shogunate, and Minamoto no Yoritomo selected the daughter of Kawagoe Shigeyori to be the bride for his younger brother Minamoto no Yoshitsune. The Kawagoe controlled much of Musashi Province until the Nanboku-chō period, but the clan was annihilated by the Uesugi clan after an uprising in 1368.

The site was later occupied by Uesugi Akisada (1454-1510), for seven years as his field headquarters in his campaign against the rival Ogigayatsu-branch of the Uesugi clan entrenched in Kawagoe Castle. It remained in use as a minor fortification by the Later Hōjō clan into the Sengoku period and was finally completely abandoned in 1590 after the fall of the Hōjō clan to the forces of Toyotomi Hideyoshi in the Siege of Odawara.

Currently, the southeastern part of the castle area is within the precincts of the Buddhist temple of Joraku-ji, and a part of the earthworks and moat survives in the vicinity. From 1971 to 1975, an archaeological excavation was conducted by the Kawagoe City Board of Education, which discovered traces from the end of the Heian period through the Sengoku period, including the foundations of buildings and the location of a well. A part of the earthworks with a height of one to three meters and a small portion of the inner moat survive. A portion of the outer moat, which is about 11 meters wide and three meters deep is northeast of the site, and thought to have been connected to the Iruma River. The site is now open to the public as the "Kawagoekan Ruins Historical Park" and is about a 15-minute walk from Kasumigaseki Station on the Tōbu Tōjō Line.

== See also ==
- List of Historic Sites of Japan (Saitama)
