= Gobōyama Site =

Yayoi-period archaeological site in Saitama, Japan

- 午王山遺跡 (Japanese)
- Gobōyama Site Gobōyama Site (Japan)
- 35°47′46″N 139°37′35″E
- Type: Settlement
- Periods: Yayoi period
- Location: Wakō, Saitama, Japan
- Region: Kantō region

Site notes
- Area: 18,601.53 m²
- Excavation dates: From 1979
- Public access: Yes

The Gobōyama Site (午王山遺跡, Gobōyama iseki) is an archaeological site containing the remains of a Yayoi period settlement in the Niikura neighborhood of Wakō, Saitama, Japan. It is located on an independent hill at the northeastern edge of the Musashino Terrace, overlooking the Arakawa River. The site is notable for its large-scale moated settlement, including multiple concentric moats, and for archaeological evidence of cultural connections between the Kantō region and other parts of central Japan.

The site was designated a National Historic Site of Japan on 10 March 2020. Portions of the site were subsequently added to the designation in 2021, 2022 and 2024. The currently designated area covers approximately 18,600 square metres.

== Overview ==
The Gobōyama Site is located on a hill approximately 24 metres above sea level at the northern edge of the Musashino Terrace. The settlement developed primarily during the middle and later phases of the Yayoi period, although archaeological remains from the Japanese Paleolithic period through the early modern period have also been identified.

The site is a large Yayoi-period settlement surrounded by multiple moats. Archaeological investigations have identified numerous pit dwellings, moats and square burial mounds. The settlement is particularly significant because multi-ring moated settlements are relatively uncommon in eastern Japan.

Archaeological investigations began in 1979, and numerous excavations have subsequently been conducted. The investigations revealed 152 pit dwellings, three moats and five square burial mounds. The settlement appears to have developed over several phases of the Yayoi period.

The two principal moats, designated A and B by archaeologists, formed a double-moated defensive system around the settlement. Moat A has a maximum width of approximately 3.2 metres and a maximum depth of approximately 1.7 metres, while moat B has a maximum width of approximately 1.8 metres and a maximum depth of approximately 0.95 metres. A third moat, moat C, was identified west of the settlement.

The construction of the principal moats dates to the later Yayoi period. Their presence indicates that the settlement was fortified during a period when conflicts and competition between communities became more prominent in the Japanese archipelago. The site's location on a hill and its multiple moats distinguish it from many other Yayoi settlements in the Kantō region.

== Burial remains ==
Five square burial mounds are located southeast of the settlement, outside the principal moats. Their location indicates a spatial separation between the residential area and the burial area. The burial structures have been heavily disturbed by later cultivation, making their original form difficult to determine.

== Artifacts and regional connections ==
A variety of artifacts have been recovered from the site, including Yayoi pottery associated with several regional traditions. Pottery connected with the Chūbu highlands, southern Kantō and the eastern Tōkai region has been identified, indicating interaction between communities in different parts of central Japan.

Among the more distinctive finds are a copper sword, dōtaku-shaped earthenware objects and other ritual artifacts. The discovery of dōtaku-shaped objects is significant because the Gobōyama Site lies outside the main distribution area traditionally associated with dōtaku culture. These finds provide evidence for cultural connections between the Kantō and Tōkai regions.

In 2018, 121 Yayoi-period artifacts excavated from the site were registered as Registered Tangible Cultural Properties by the Japanese government.

== Historical tradition ==
Local tradition associates the hill with an exiled prince from Silla, one of the ancient Korean kingdoms. The Shinpen Musashi Fudokishō reportedly describes the location as the remains of a Silla royal residence. This tradition is not considered archaeological evidence for the existence of such a residence.

== See also ==
- List of Historic Sites of Japan (Saitama)
