= Tochimoto Barrier =

Tochimoto-no-seki 栃本関跡
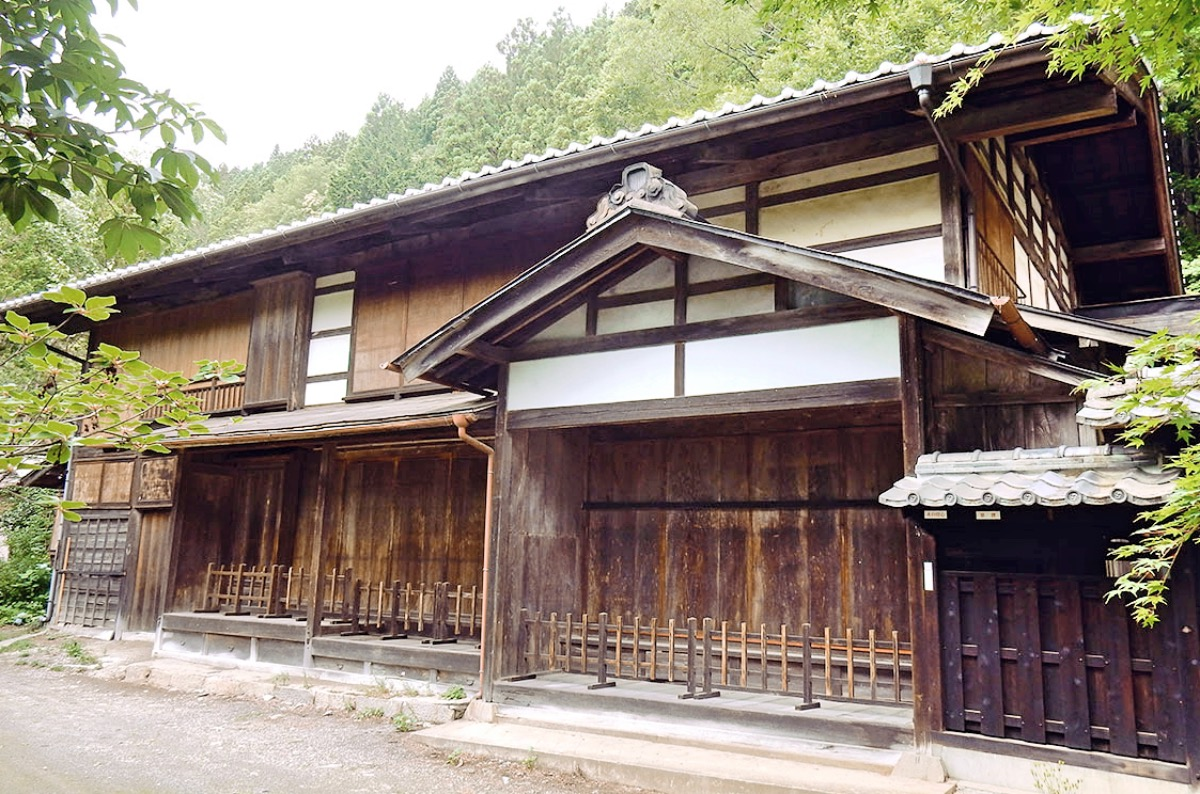
- Tochimoto Checkpoint

- Location within Saitama Prefecture Location within Japan

General information
- Location: 1227-5 Arai, Arai-machi, Chichibu, Saitama, Japan
- Coordinates: 35°56′41″N 138°51′45″E

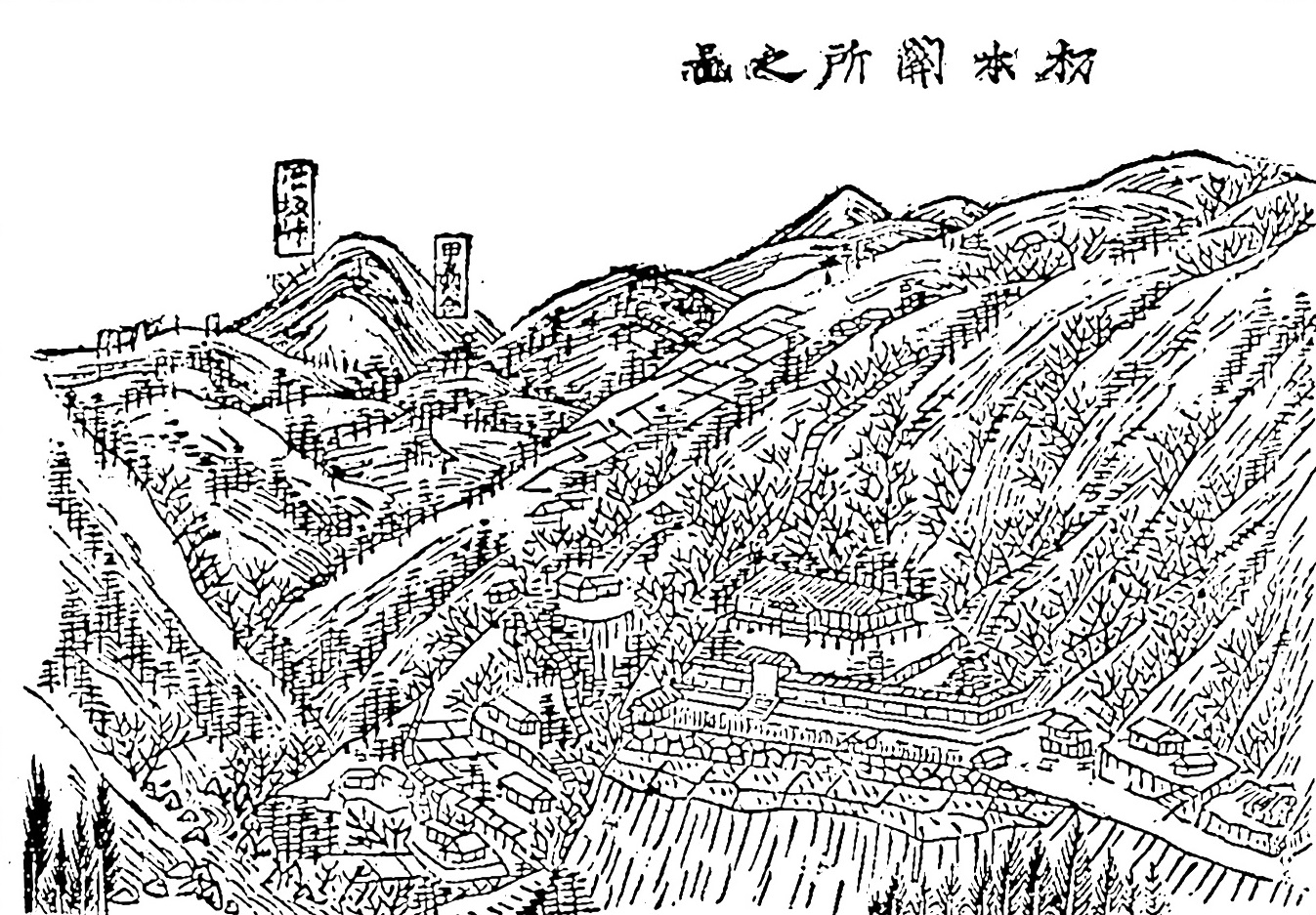
Edo period sketch

The Tochimoto Barrier (栃本関跡, Tochimoto-no-seki) was a security checkpoint on the road connecting Kai Province with Musashi Province via the Karisaka Pass in the Okuchichibu Mountains in Edo period Japan. In 1970, the surviving building of the checkpoint on the Musashi side of the pass (now part of the city of Chichibu, Saitama) was recognized as a National Historic Site.

== Overview ==
The Tokugawa shogunate tended to view highways as strategic liabilities, and took steps to regulate and control traffic on all major thoroughfares, especially in the vicinity of the capital of Edo. The Karisaka Pass, with an elevation of 2082 meters, was not on one of these major routes: however, it had been regarded as important by Takeda Shingen, the warlord of Kai Province, during the Sengoku period due to its proximity to his gold mines, and as a "backdoor" between Kai and Musashi. After the establishment of the Tokugawa shogunate, its remoteness drew the attention of security officials enforcing the government policy of "No rifles in, no women out" of the city of Edo, and a decision was made to permanently station officials at checkpoints on both sides of the pass. Bansho (番所) were established at Aso village in Musashi (present day Ōtaki, Saitama) and at Kawamoto village in Kai (present-day Yamanashi city, Yamanashi). All travelers were required to submit to an examination of their travel permits, and taxes were levied on commercial travelers with merchandise.

Following the Meiji Restoration, the barrier was abolished in 1869. The government office on the Musashi side was destroyed by fire in 1823, but was rebuilt and is still standing. This two-story wooden structure was the basis of the National Historic Site designation in 1970. The route of modern Japan National Route 140 closely approximately the ancient highway.

== See also ==
- List of Historic Sites of Japan (Saitama)
