= Omishinkanji Kofun =

Burial mound in Japan

Omishinkanji kofun
- 小見真観寺古墳 (Japanese)
- Omishinkanji kofun

- Omishinkanji kofun Omishinkanji Kofun (Japan)
- 36°09′34″N 139°28′36″E
- Type: kofun
- Periods: Kofun period
- Location: Gyōda, Saitama, Japan
- Region: Kantō region

History
- Built: late 6th to early 7th century AD

Site notes
- Public access: Yes (no facilities)

The Omishinkanji Kofun (小見真観寺古墳) is a Kofun period burial mound located in the Omi neighborhood of the city of Gyōda, Saitama Prefecture in the Kantō region of Japan. It was designated a National Historic Site of Japan in 1931.

== Overview ==
The Omishinkanji Kofun is a zenpō-kōen-fun (前方後円墳), which is shaped like a keyhole, having one square end and one circular end, when viewed from above. it is the fourth largest keyhole-shaped tumulus in Saitama prefecture. The tumulus is located within the precincts of Shinkan-ji, a Buddhist temple on the right bank of the Hoshikawa, which flows east through the northern part of Gyōda. The tumulus has a total length of 102 meters and is orientated west-northwest. The main burial chamber is located in the south side of the posterior circular portion and was discovered in 1634. It is an unusually elaborate chamber in that it contained two rooms separated by a monolithic stone with square windows. The front chamber had a length of 2.7 meters, width 2.2 meters and height 2.1 m, and the entrance chamber had a length of 2.4 meters, width 2.2 meters and height 2.1 meters. The burial chamber was constructed of megaliths of schist quarried in the Chichibu region. A second burial chamber for a subsequent burial was located in the saddle area of the tumulus in 1880, and a large number of grave goods, including gold rings, iron swords, bronze ornaments, and earthenware were discovered. These items are now stored at the Tokyo National Museum. Later archaeological excavations revealed that the tumulus had once been surrounded by a moat, from which many fragments of haniwa were recovered. These haniwa and the shape of the mound dates this tumulus to the end of the 6th century to the beginning of the 7th century AD.

The tumulus is one of four tumuli forming the Omi Kofun Group. The Kokuzoyama Kofun (虚空蔵山古墳) is another keyhole-shaped tumulus with length of 40 to 50 meters and is a Saitama Prefectural Historic Site. The other two tumuli in the cluster are smaller empun (円墳) circular-type mounds. The Omishinkanji Kofun is located about 15 minutes on foot from Bushū-Araki Station on the Chichibu Railway Chichibu Main Line.

Overall length
102 meters
Posterior circular portion
55 meter diameter x 7.8 meter high
Anterior rectangular portion
48 meters wide x 7 meters high

== See also ==
- List of Historic Sites of Japan (Saitama)
