= Suedono Tile Kiln =

Archaeological Site

Suedono Tile Kiln ruins
- 水殿瓦窯跡 (Japanese)
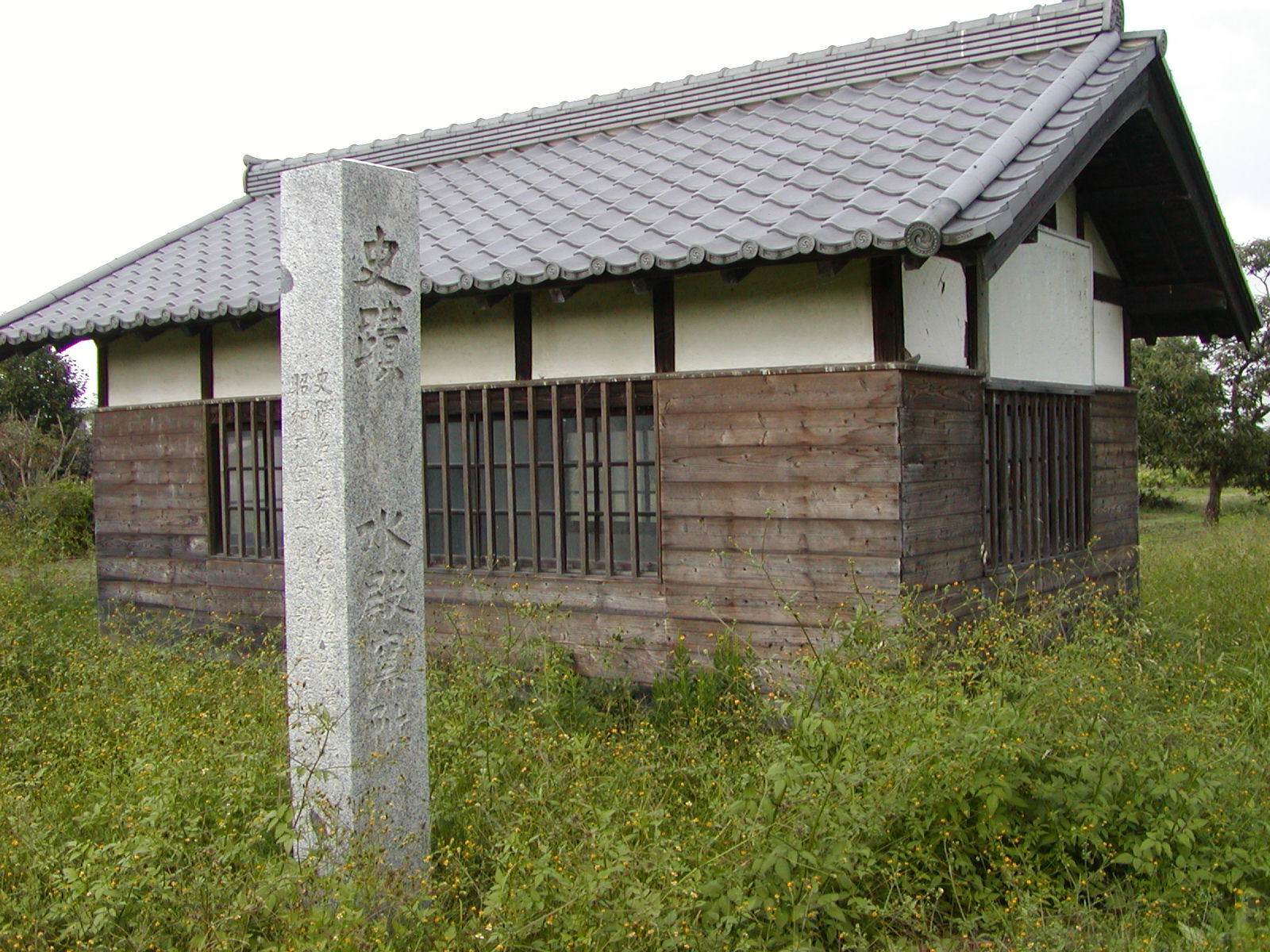
- Suedono Tile Kiln ruins

- Suedono Tile Kiln ruins Suedono Tile Kiln (Japan)
- 36°11′28″N 139°09′45″E
- Periods: Kamakura period
- Location: Misato, Saitama, Japan
- Region: Kantō region

Site notes
- Public access: Yes (public park)

The Suedono Tile Kiln ruins (水殿瓦窯跡, Suedono kawara kama ato) is an archaeological site with the ruins of a Kamakura period kiln, located in the Numagami neighborhood of the city of Misato, Saitama Prefecture in the Kantō region of Japan. It was designated a National Historic Site of Japan in 1931.

== Overview ==
Kawara (瓦) roof tiles made of fired clay were introduced to Japan from Baekche during the 6th century along with Buddhism. During the 570s under the reign of Emperor Bidatsu, the king of Baekche sent six people to Japan skilled in various aspects of Buddhism, including a temple architect. Initially, tiled roofs were a sign of great wealth and prestige, and used for temple and government buildings. The material had the advantages of great strength and durability, and could also be made at locations around the country wherever clay was available.

The Suedono site is located in the northwestern part of the prefecture, in the southwestern part of the Honjō Plateau, surrounded by rolling hills. In 1929, an archaeological excavation of the kiln dated it to the Kamakura period from the tile shards found, and due to its good preservation, and the kiln ruins were designated as a National Historic Site in 1931. In an excavation conducted in 1989, the remains of four tile kilns were found, in the form of flat kilns made from hollowed out ground, with a length of 3.3 meters, and a width of 1.1 meters and depth of 1.2 meters. The roof tiles produced in this tile kiln were transported to Kamakura and were used on important temples and shrines. In particular, it was discovered that tiles from this site were used at the now-extinct temple of Yōfuku-ji in Nikaidō, Kamakura.

The site is located a 30-minute walk from the "Anashi" bus stop on the Musashi Kanko Bus from Honjō Station on the JR East Takasaki Line.

== See also ==
- List of Historic Sites of Japan (Saitama)
