= Sannōzuka Kofun =

Burial mound in Japan

- 山王塚古墳 (Japanese)
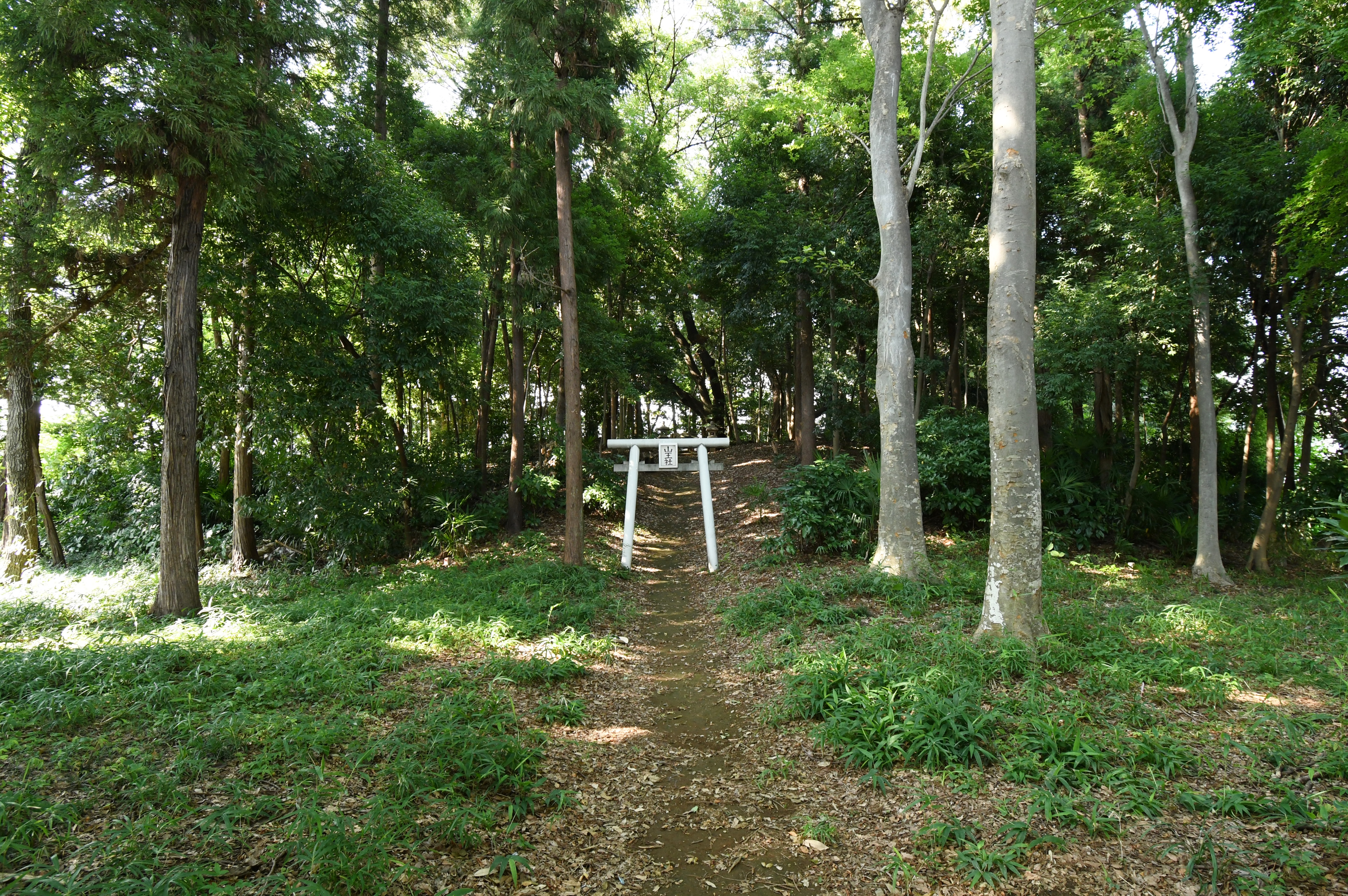
- Sannōzuka Kofun

- Sannōzuka Kofun Sannōzuka Kofun (Japan)
- Interactive map of Sannōzuka Kofun
- 35°54′0″N 139°27′43″E
- Type: kofun
- Periods: Kofun period
- Location: Toyodacho 3-chome, Kawagoe-shi, Saitama-ken
- Region: Kantō region

History
- Built: late 7th century

Site notes
- Area: 8,409.43 m^{2} (90,518.4 sq ft)
- Public access: Yes (Park)

The Sannōzuka Kofun (山王塚古墳) is a Kofun period burial mound located in what is now the city of Kawagoe, Saitama Prefecture in the Kantō region of Japan. It was designated a Kawagoe City Historic Site in 1958 and a National Historic Site of Japan in 2023.

== Overview ==
The Sannōzuka Kofun is the largest of the Minami-Ōtsuka Kofun Group, which consists of 27 known kofun in Kawagoe city. It is a highly unusual jōen-kahō-fun (上円下方墳), which consists of a square base with a circular tumulus on top. Only six burial mounds of this configuration are known to exist, all in eastern Japan, and are believed to be the graves of local kings. Based on its unusual shape and excavated artifacts, it is estimated to have been constructed in the third quarter of the 7th century (651–675), during the latter half of the Late Kofun period. The lower section measures approximately 69 meters on each side, and the upper circular section measures 37 meters in diameter. The surrounding moat is approximately 90 meters on each side, and the mound embankment is 5 meters high. The mound and parts of the surrounding moat are in good condition. It is the largest confirmed kofun in Japan among those with a circular upper section.

The main burial area is a horizontal stone burial chamber with three chambers connected in a linear fashion. Excavations have uncovered a bed of river stone, side walls made of andesite, and a front gate pillar made of schist. Sue ware, small glass beads, and iron nails have also been found within the chambers (some of the excavated artifacts are on display at the Kawagoe City Museum).

== See also ==
- List of Historic Sites of Japan (Saitama)
