= Komae Village Stone Age Dwelling Site =

Archaeological site in Japan

Koma Village Stone Age Dwelling Site
- 高麗村石器時代住居跡 (Japanese)
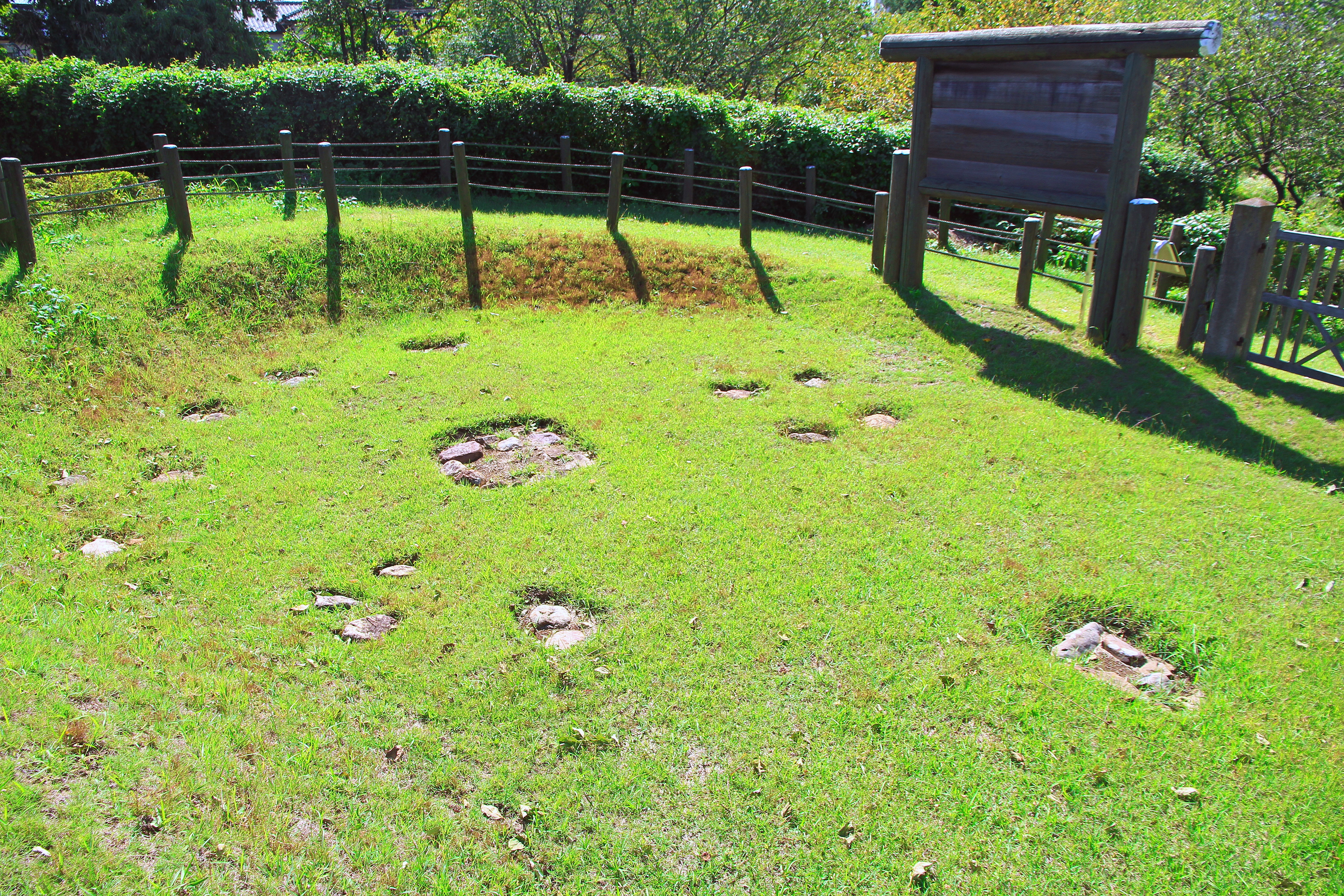
- Koma Village Stone Age Dwelling Site

- Koma Village Stone Age Dwelling Site Komae Village Stone Age Dwelling Site (Japan)
- 35°53′00″N 139°18′14″E
- Type: settlement
- Periods: Jōmon period
- Location: Hidaka, Saitama, Japan
- Region: Kantō region

Site notes
- Public access: Yes (no public facilities)

The Koma Village Stone Age Dwelling Site (高麗村石器時代住居跡, Koma-mura sekki-jidai jūkyo ato) is an archaeological site in the city of Hidaka, Saitama Prefecture, in the Kantō region of Japan containing a Jōmon period settlement ruin. The site was designated a National Historic Site of Japan in 1951.

== Overview ==
The Koma site is located at the foot of Mount Tonosu in the eastern Kantō Mountains, with an elevation of about 100 meters, overlooking the Koma River in the north. It was discovered in 1929 and was found to contain many fragments of Jōmon pottery, stone axes and other artifacts from the Jōmon period scattered on the surface, and subsequent archaeological excavation revealed the foundations of many pit dwellings, most with traces of a hearth in the center, and some overlapping, forming gourd shape. The state of preservation was considered to be extremely good. Further excavation surveys have been conducted with the development of Japan National Route 299 in 2008 and in 2011. During these excavations, the foundations of 11 pit dwellings from the middle Jōmon period were found in a narrow area of approximately 200 square meters. In the remains of the No. 5 house a deep pot-shaped earthenware vessel was found lying upside down in a small hole. In the site of No. 6 house, an earthenware vessel was installed in the center of a stone hearth surrounded by a square made from stone, and two burial pits were found under the floor.

The site is located about a five minutes walk from Koma Station on the Seibu Railway Ikebukuro Line.

== See also ==
- List of Historic Sites of Japan (Saitama)
