= Ichirizuka =

Japanese distance markers built with earth mounds and trees

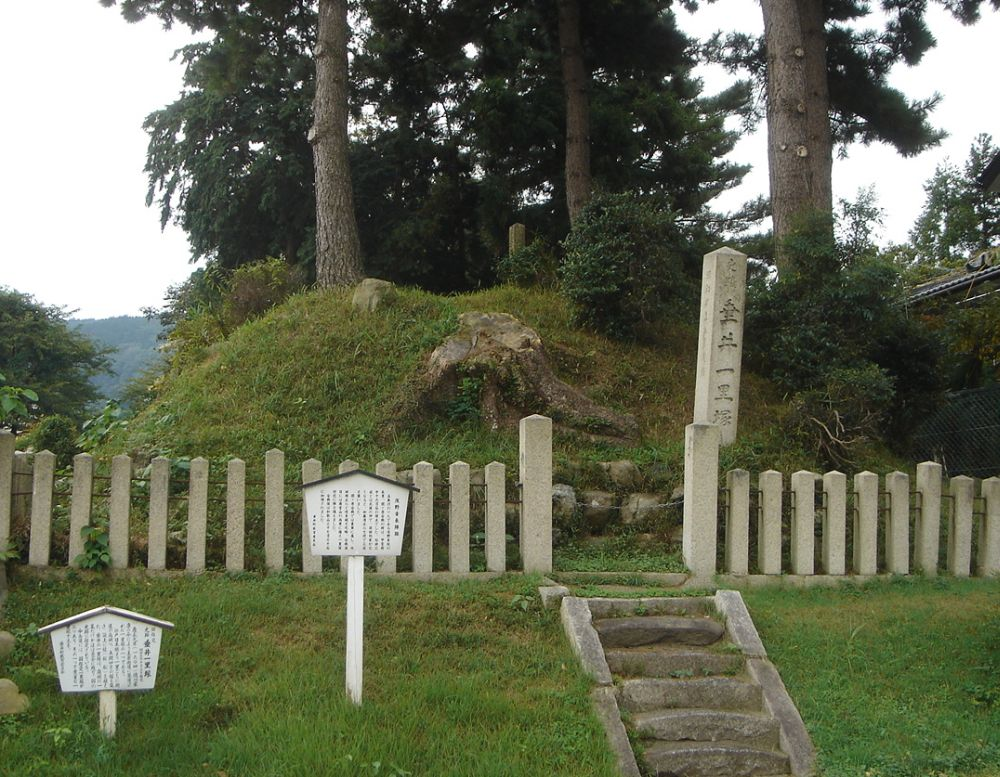
Ichirizuka at Tarui-juku, one of the 69 Stations of the Nakasendō; only one of the two mounds survives, to a height of 4.7 metres (15 ft); designated a national Historic Site

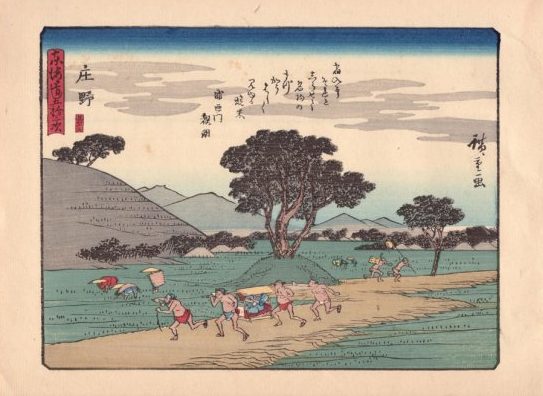
Ichirizuka at Shōno-juku, one of the 53 Stations of the Tōkaidō; woodblock print by Hiroshige, c. 1842, from an alternative series of The Fifty-three Stations of the Tōkaidō (Kyōkairi Tōkaidō or Sanoki edition); the mound is explicitly labelled ichirizuka in a later print by Hiroshige II ()

Ichirizuka (一里塚) are historic Japanese distance markers akin to milestones. Comprising a pair of earthen mounds (tsuka or zuka) covered in trees and flanking the road, they denoted the distance in ri (3.927 kilometres (2.440 mi)) to Nihonbashi, the "Bridge of Japan", erected in Edo in 1603. Ichirizuka were encountered and described by Engelbert Kaempfer, c.1690: "serving as a milestone are two hills, facing each other, which are raised up on both sides of the road, and planted with one or more trees." (Note: "Zu einem Meilenzeichen dienen zween gegen einander stehende Hugel, welche zu beiden Seiten des Weges aufge worfen und mit einem oder mehr Baumen bepflanzt sind" (Geschichte und Beschreibung von Japan))

== Establishment ==
The Tokugawa shogunate established ichirizuka on the major roads in 1604, enabling calculation both of distance travelled and of the charge for transportation by kago or palanquin. These mounds, to be maintained by "post stations and local villages", were one component of the developing road infrastructure, which also included bridges and ferries; post stations (both shukuba, and the more informal ai no shuku); and tea-houses (chaya). However, the main aim was "official mobility, not recreational travelling": the movement of farmers and women was discouraged, and a system of passports and barriers (関所) maintained. By marking the distance from Edo rather than Kyoto,

establishing a symbolic point of origin for all movements, the Tokugawa made of mile markers what they would later make of checkpoints: powerful reminders of the government's geopolitical ubiquity and efficacious tools in its appropriation of space.

Ichirizuka were important enough to be found on the well-known "Proportional Map of the Tokaido" by printmaker Hishikawa Moronobu (d. 1694). A traditional poem allegorically compares the ichirizuka that mark distance to the Kadomatsu marking the years of a person's life.

== Survival ==
With the modernization of Japan in the Meiji period, many of the mounds disappeared through road-widening and construction schemes, and the survival of both is now rare. Of ichirizuka that are still extant, sixteen have been designated for protection as national Historic Sites, including one mound in Mibu on the old Nikkō Kaidō (Route 18). Of the two within Tokyo, the one at Nishigahara was once threatened by a road-widening project. A movement to save it was led by industrialist Shibusawa Eiichi, the "father of Japanese capitalism." The struggle is commemorated in a monument beside what is now Hongō-dōri (本郷通り). (35°44′50″N 139°44′28″E)

== See also ==
- Kaidō
- Station bell
- Sankin-kōtai
- Milliarium Aureum
- Sukagawa Ichirizuka
