= Shōbō-ji (Higashimatsuyama) =

Buddhist temple in Saitama Prefecture, Japan

- 正法寺
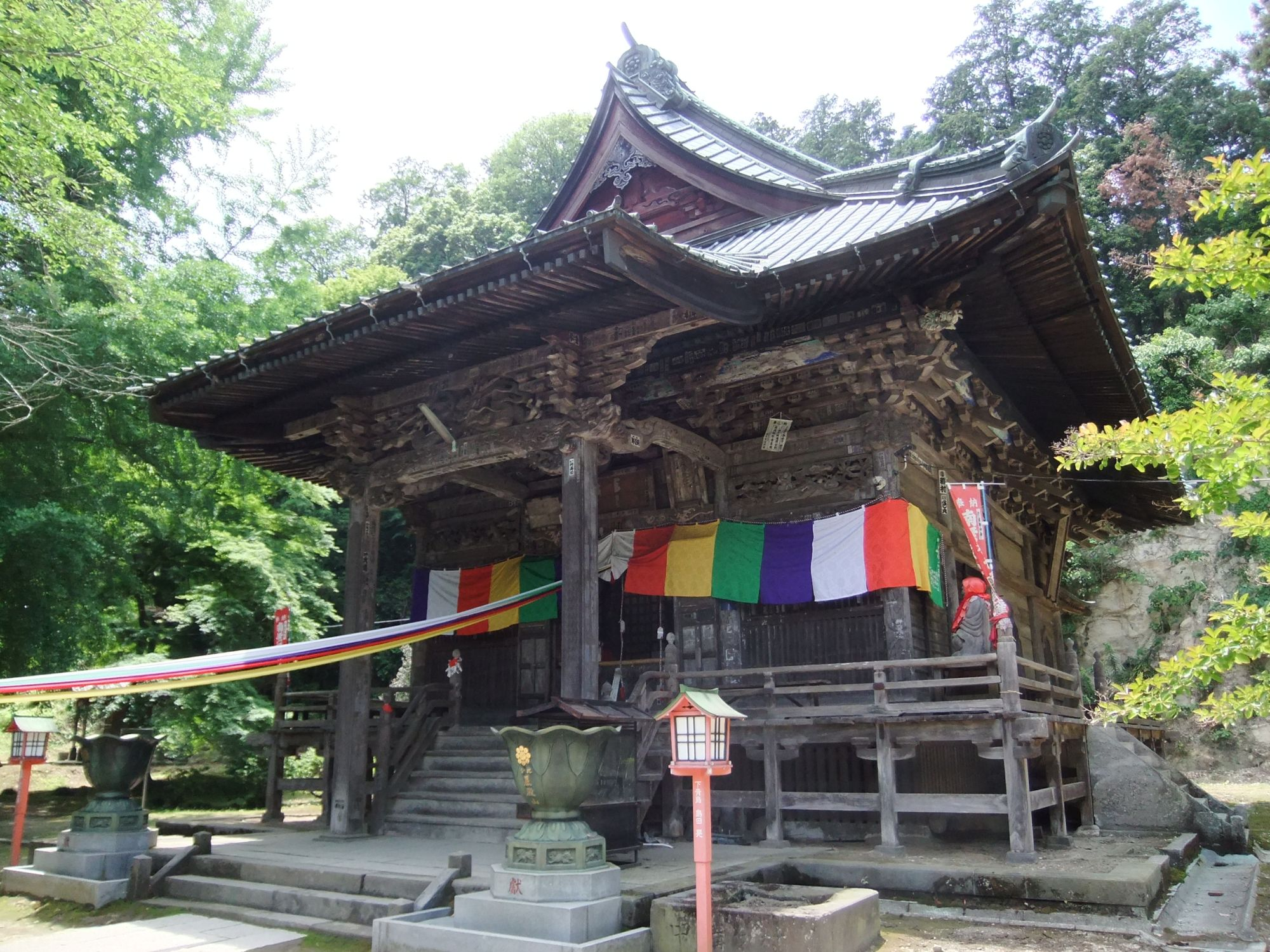
- Shōbō-ji Kannon-dō

- Location within Saitama Prefecture Location within Japan

Religion
- Affiliation: Buddhist
- Deity: Senjū Kannon Bosatsu (Sahasrabhūja)
- Rite: Shingon-shū Chisan-ha
- Status: functional

Location
- Location: 1229 Iwadono, Higashimatsuyama-shi, Saitama-ken 355-0065
- Country: Japan
- Interactive map of Shōbō-ji
- Coordinates: 36°00′05″N 139°21′44.5″E

Architecture
- Founder: unknown
- Completed: c. 718

Website
- iwadonosan-shoboji.org

Shōbō-ji (正法寺) is a Buddhist temple located in the city of Higashimatsuyama, Saitama Prefecture, Japan. It belongs to the Shingon-shū Chisan-ha sect and its honzon is a statue of Senjū Kannon Bosatsu (Sahasrabhūja). The temple's full name is Iwadono-san Shōbō-ji (巌殿山 正法寺).The temple is the 10th stop on the Bandō Sanjūsankasho pilgrimage route. It is also called the "Iwadono Kannon".

== History ==
The details surrounding the founding of this temple are uncertain. According to the temple's legend, it was founded in 718 by a shugendō monk named Etsumi on slope of Mount Iwadono, who installed a statue of Kannon Bosatsu into a rock cave and erected a hermitage next to it in response of a vision on the holy mountain.

In the early Heian period, the general Sakanoue no Tamuramaro, while on his way to conquer Ōshū heard that an evil dragon had settled on Mount Iwadono, and was troubling the local villagers. He was able to defeat the dragon with the assistance of Kannon Bosatsu, and after his victorious return to Kyoto he told the story to Emperor Kammu. The delighted emperor ordered the expansion of the hermitage into a temple in 796.

The temple later fell into ruins, but was restored by Hiki Yoshikazu on orders of Minamoto no Yoritomo in the early years of the Kamakura shogunate.

The temple grew into a large institution and had 66 hermitages during the Muromachi period. Afterwards it was repeatedly destroyed by the wars of the Sengoku period. Musashi Matsuyama Castle is located only about ten kilometres from Shōbō-ji. The castle was the site of repeated battles between the Uesugi clan and the Hōjō clan, which devastated the region. The temple was burned down by Hōjō Ujiyasu in the Siege of Musashi-Matsuyama (1563). Seven years later, in 1574, the temple was revived by the monk Eishun, as its honzon image of the Senjū Kannon, had narrowly escaped being destroyed in the war.

Under the Tokugawa shogunate, the temple received estates for its upkeep and tax exemptions, and was a popular pilgrimage destination. However, after the Meiji restoration, the temple suffered greatly from the early Meiji government's Haibutsu kishaku movement, and lost much of its territories and revenues.

The current Kannon-dō was originally a small temple in the nearby city of Hannō that was transferred here after the previous structure was destroyed in a fire in 1871.

The honzon Senjū Kannon statue is said to have been created during the Muromachi period. The hall is surrounded by rock walls and contains 88 small Buddha figures, one for each of the 88 temples on the Shikoku Pilgrimage.

== Images of the temple ==
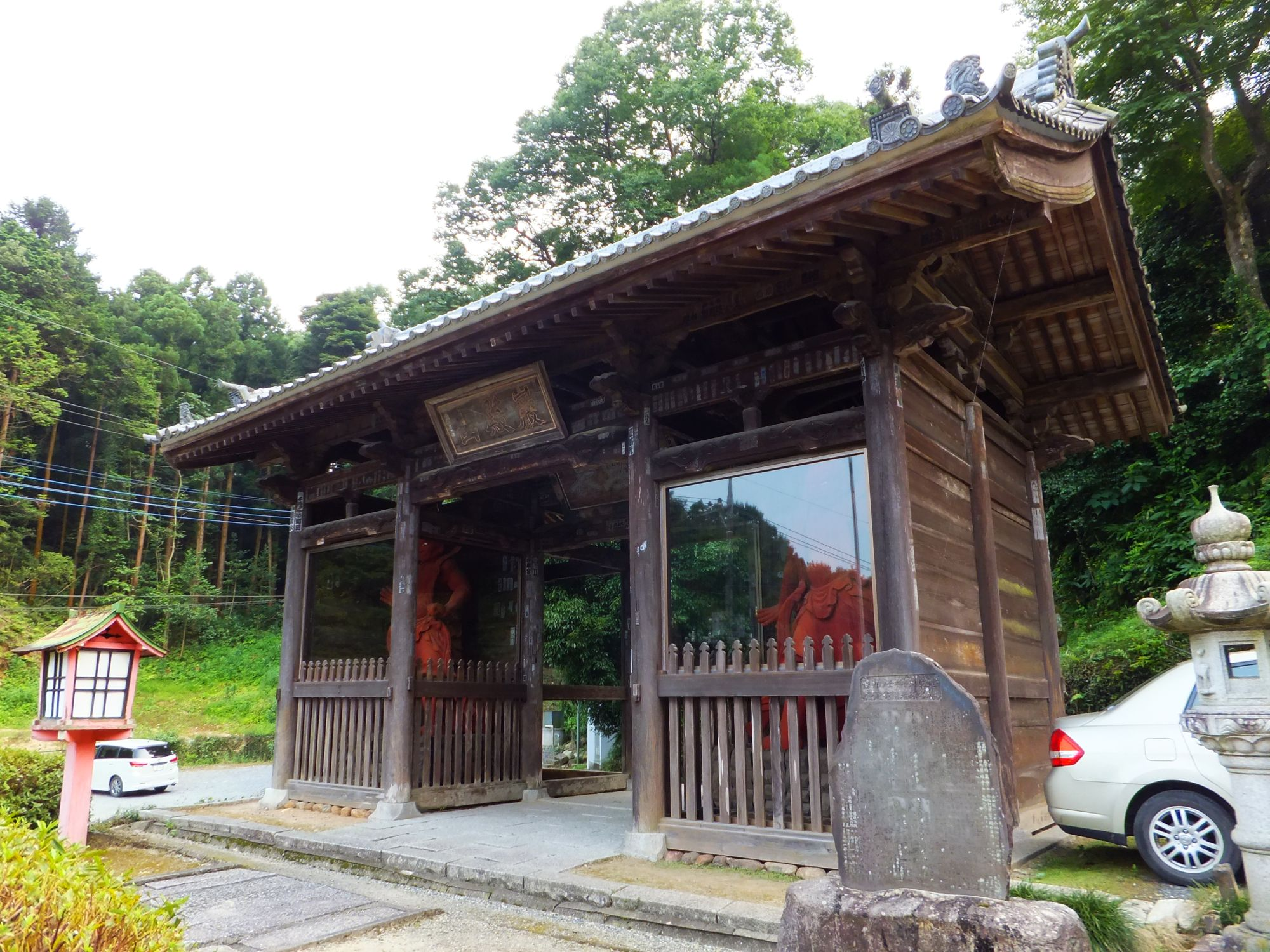
Niōmon

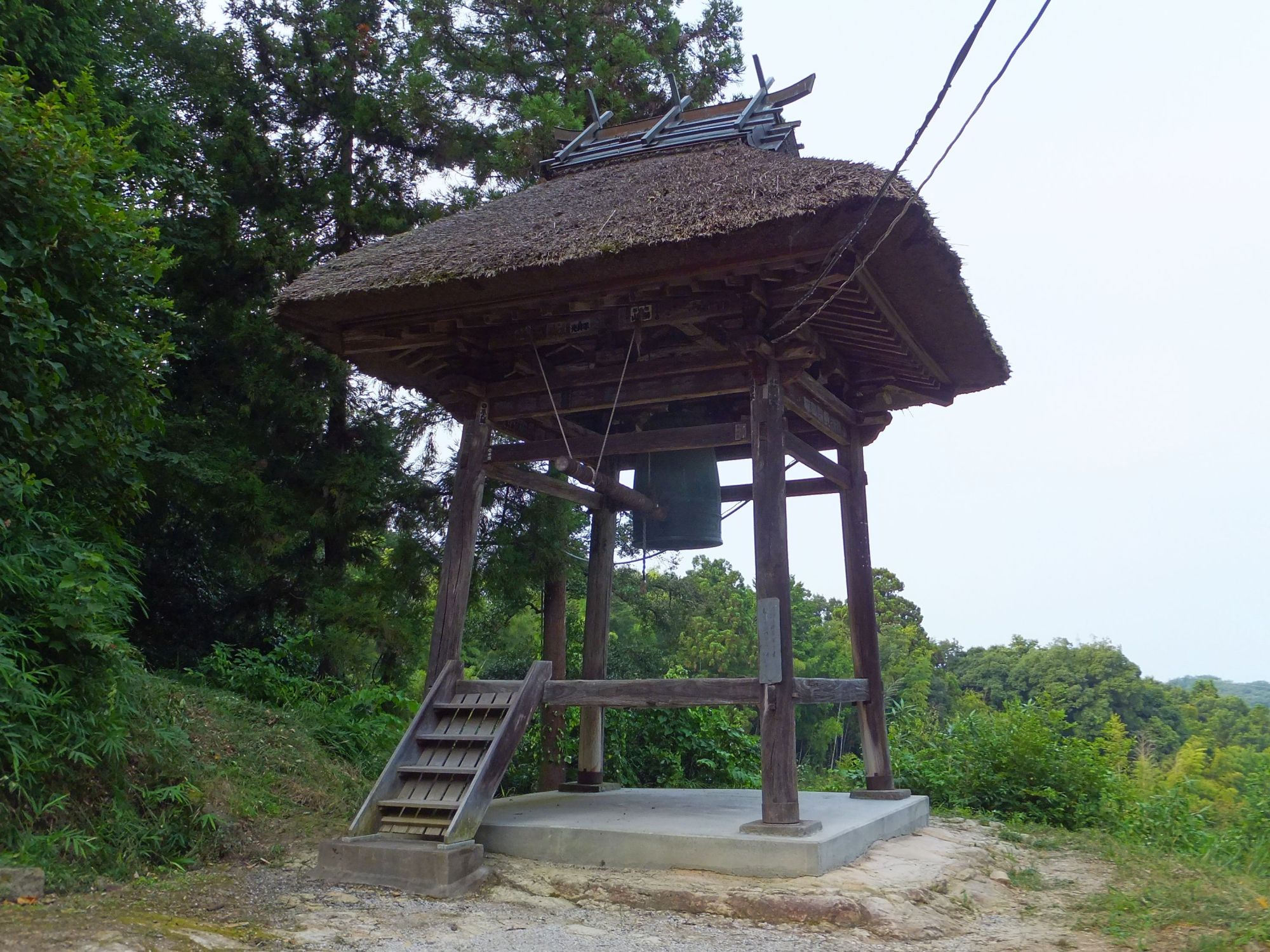
Shōrō and bonshō

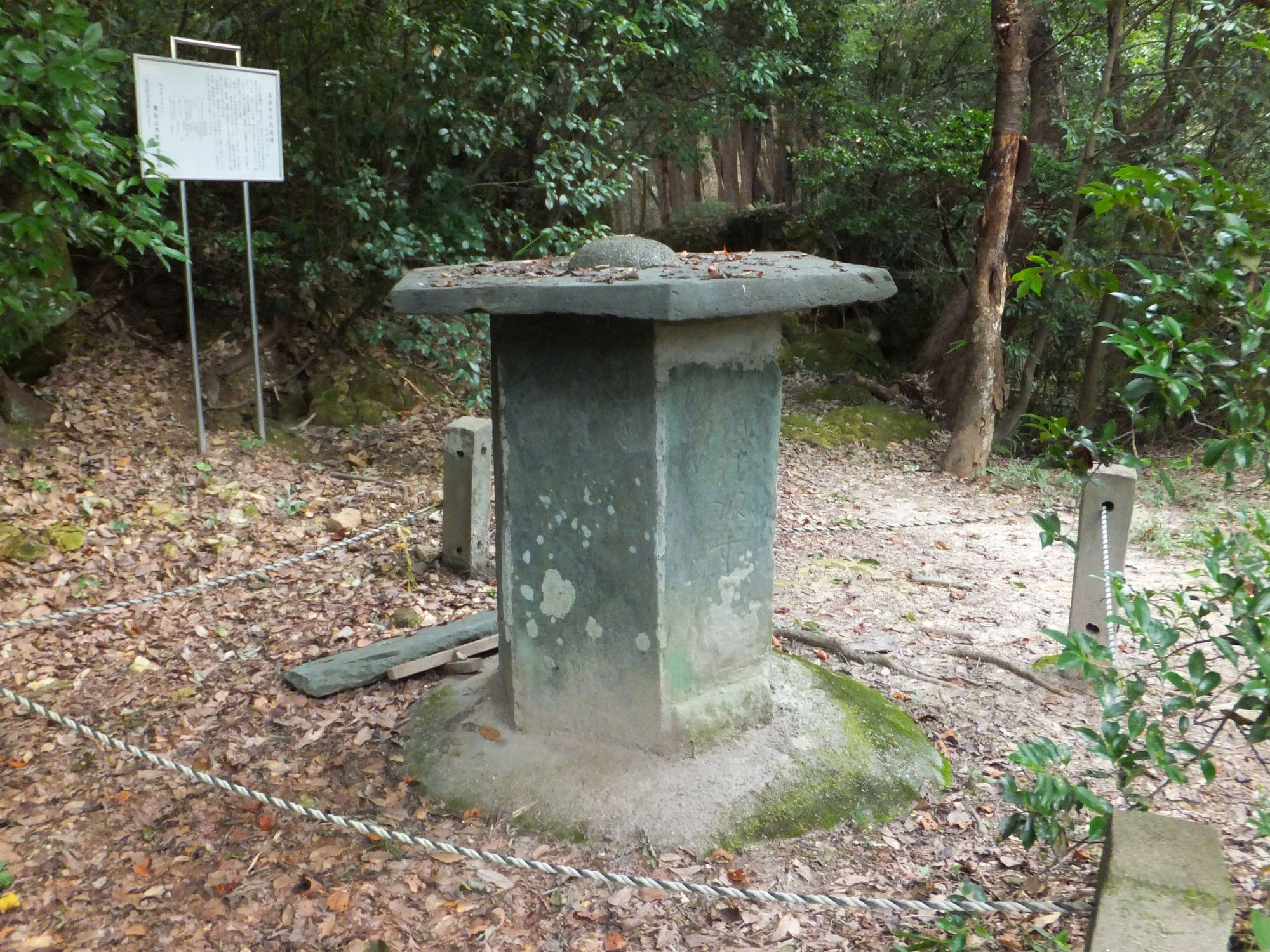
Rokumen-tō

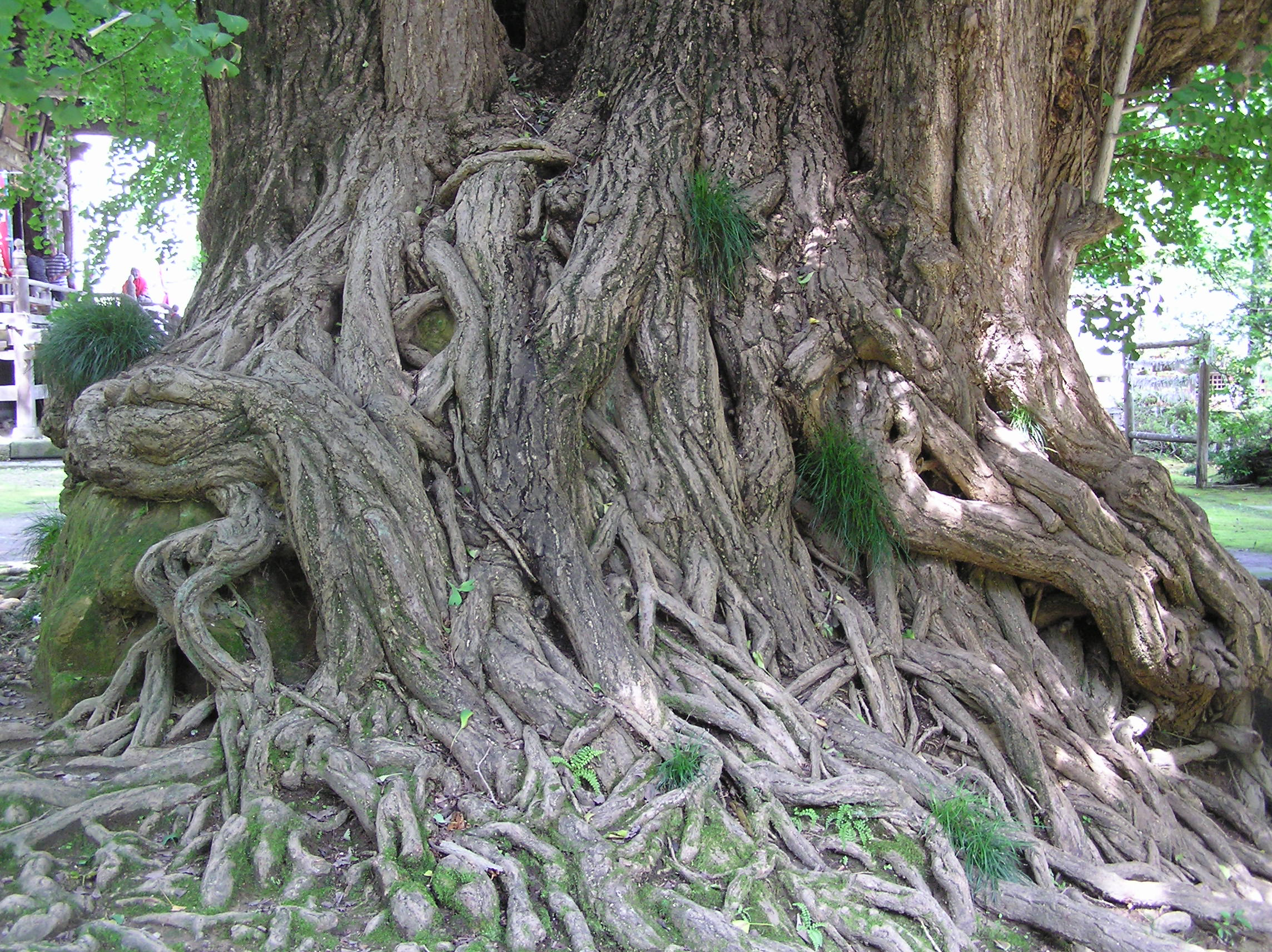
Ginkgo tree

== Bandō Sanjūsankasho (Bandō 33 temple pilgrimage) ==
The temple is the 26th temple on the 33 temple Bandō Sanjūsankasho pilgrimage route.

== Access ==
The temple is located approximately 3.2 kilometers west of Takasaka Station (Tōbu Tōjō Line).

== Cultural Properties ==
=== Saitama Prefecture Tangible Cultural Properties ===
- Bonshō (銅鐘), Bronze bell, cast in 1322, the bell has a double dragon head with a height of 32 centimeters, the bell body is 113 centimeters high, the thickness of the lower band is 7 centimeters, and the diameter is 106 centimeters. There are numerous scratches on the outside, which are marks from when Toyotomi Hideyoshi dragged it through the mountains during the 1590 Battle of Matsuyama Castle.

=== Saitama Prefecture Historic Site ===
- Rokumen-tō (六面幢), This is a hexagonal column was created by combining six slab of chlorite schist (blue stone), and with a hexagonal capstone on top ( but one of the stones is missing). The height is 107 cm, the size of each stone slab is 36 cm in width and 101 cm in height, and the diameter of the capstone is 128 cm. Around the periphery of the capstone, flying clouds are carved, and on the back side there are extremely elaborate carvings of a dragon, a treasure ball, a lion, and hōsōge flowers. It has an inscription stating that it was erected in February 1582 by the monk Dosho of Mt. Iwadono to hold a memorial service for the founder of the mountain, Eishun, his disciples.

=== Higashimatsuyama City Tangible Cultural Properties ===
- Shōrō (鐘楼); The Belfry housing Shōbō-ji's bronze bell is the oldest structure in Higashimatsuyama City. It was built in 1702.
