= Mirokuji kanga ruins =

Archaeological site in Japan

Mirokuji Kanga ruins
- 弥勒寺官衙遺跡群 (Japanese)
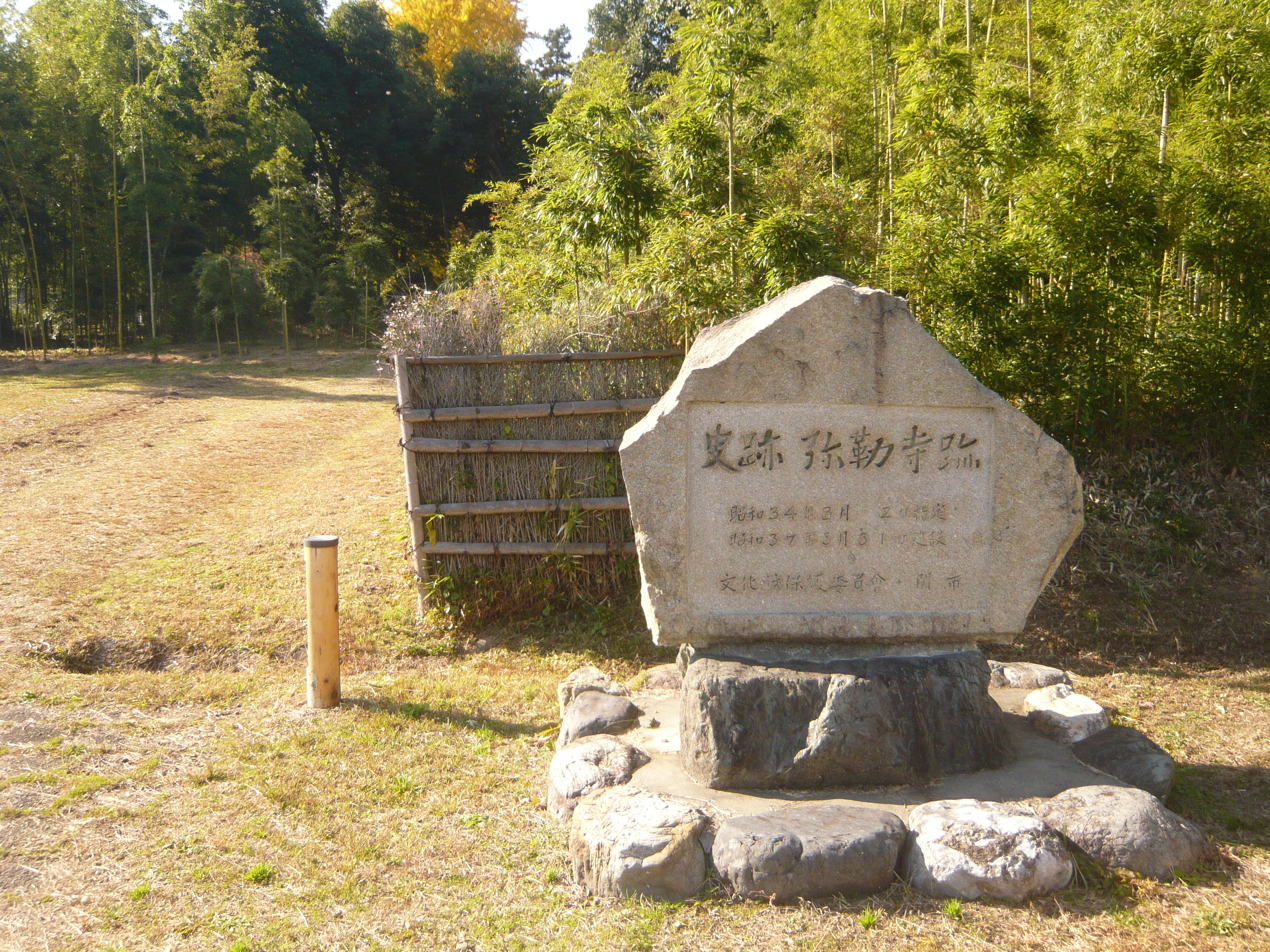
- Ruins of Mirokuji Temple

- Mirokuji Kanga ruins Mirokuji kanga ruins (Japan)
- 35°30′21″N 136°53′33″E
- Periods: Hakuho - Heian period
- Location: Seki, Mino, Japan
- Region: Chubu region

History
- Built: 7th century AD

Site notes
- Elevation: 27 m (89 ft)
- Public access: Yes

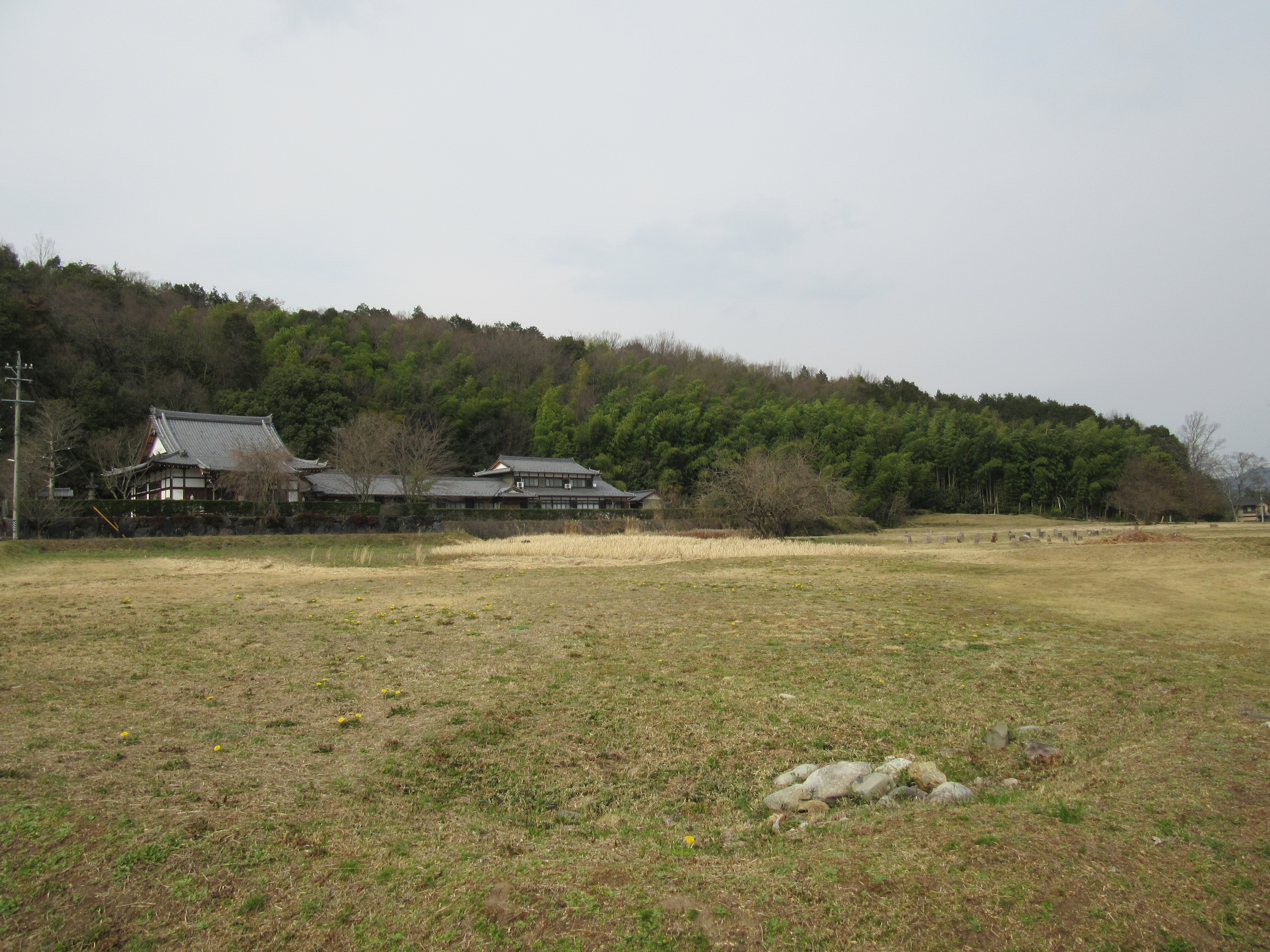
Mirokuji Kanga ruins

The Mirokuji Kanga ruins (弥勒寺官衙遺跡群, Mirokuji kanga iseki gun) is an archaeological site with the ruins of a Hakuho to Heian period Buddhist temple and government administrative complex located in what is now the cities of Seki and Mino in Gifu prefecture in the Chūbu region of Japan. The site consists of the Mirokuji temple ruins (弥勒寺跡, Mirokuji iseki), the Maruyama Kiln ruins (丸山古窯跡, Maruyama kokama ato) and the Mirokuji Kanga ruins (弥勒寺官衙遺跡群, Mirokuji kanga iseki). The ruins were protected as a National Historic Site in 1959, with the area designated expanded in 1994 and again in 2007.

== Overview ==
In the late Nara period, after the establishment of a centralized government under the Ritsuryō system, local rule over the provinces was standardized under a kokufu (provincial capital), and each province was divided into smaller administrative districts, known as (郡, gun, kōri), composed of 2–20 townships in 715 AD. Each of the units had an administrative complex built on a semi-standardized layout based on contemporary Chinese design, and was often accompanied by a district temple, which was a smaller version of the provincial kokubun-ji temples.

=== The Mirokuji temple ruins ===
The ruins of a Miroku-ji temple are located in the Ikejiri neighborhood of the city of Seki, on the south side of a river terrace on the Kose Gorge, which was formed just before the Nagara River reaches the Nobi Plain. Per an archaeological excavation conducted in 1953, the foundations of most of the main temple buildings were found: a five by four bay Kondō, Lecture Hall, Kyozo, Bonshō, Middle Gate, cloister, South Gate and Pagoda. The pagoda had a base that was 11 meters square. From the layout and the style of the roof tiles uncovered, it is estimated that the temple was built in the latter half of the 7th century, or the Hakuho period. The layout was patterned after the temple of Hokki-ji in Ikaruga, Nara with the Kondō in the west and the Pagoda in the east, both of which were in a courtyard formed by the cloister which connected the Middle Gate with the Lecture Hall.

=== Maruyama Kiln ruins ===
In the Oyada neighborhood of the neighboring city of Mino, about three kilometers northwest of the temple ruins, a site containing the ruins of four old kilns. These kilns are noborigama-style kilns. Fragments of roof tiles and Sue ware pottery, identical to those found at the Mirokuji temple ruins have been found at this site, indicating that it supplied to the temple when it was constructed in the Hakuho period.

As a result of an archaeological excavation, the ruins of the No. 1 kiln were completely destroyed, but numerous artifacts were discovered. The No. 2 kiln is well preserved, except the end was truncated and is now paddy fields; what remains is currently protected by a fence and roof. It has a length of 9.3 meters, a maximum width of 1.7 meters, a ceiling of 1.25 meters at the entry, and 55 centimeters at the flue. A large number of Sue pottery fragments were found near the entry, and fragments of many roof tiles. The remains of the No. 3 and No. 4 kilns were preserved unexcavated.

=== Mirokuji Kanga ruins ===
During archaeological excavations on the east side of the ruins of Mirokuji temple ruins, an adjacent complex containing raised floor buildings was discovered in 1959. It was determined that this was the site of the tax warehouse complex associated with the administrative office of ancient Mugi District. The actual site of the Kanga, or administrative complex has yet to be determined.

The site is about 10 minutes by car from Seki Station on the Nagaragawa Railway. The ruins of Miroku-ji are now a park, but the other two portions of the site are backfilled.

== See also ==
- List of Historic Sites of Japan (Gifu)
