= Home Liner =

Japanese limited-stop commuter train services

Home Liner (ホームライナー) is the generic name given to limited-stop commuter train services operated by railway companies in Japan, which require the purchase of a supplementary jōsha seiriken (乗車整理券) or Liner Ticket (ライナー券) in addition to the base fare ticket. The supplementary ticket guarantees passengers a seat on board. This article describes all commuter services in Japan fitting this definition, regardless of whether their names actually include the title "Home Liner".

These services generally use express or limited-express train rolling stock, and the early-morning inbound and late-evening outbound movements often form an effective way to move rolling stock between depots in preparation for the next day's operations.

== History ==
The name "Home Liner" was first coined in June 1984 by JNR when an empty stock working for an Asama 189 series EMU was used to carry passengers from Ueno to Ōmiya on the Tōhoku Main Line in the evening for a supplementary fare of 300 yen. Initially, only four of the twelve cars in the train were made available to passengers, but the popularity of the service resulted in three evening Home Liner trains being introduced from Ueno to Ōmiya from September 1984. The first morning Liner service appeared in November 1986 with the introduction of the Shōnan Liner from Odawara to Tokyo on the Tōkaidō Main Line, and the Hanwa Liner from Wakayama to Tennōji on the Hanwa Line. JR West has since discontinued Home Liner services, replacing them with extra limited express or rapid trains.

== Fares ==
Additional fares required to ride JR Group home liner trains are as follows:

- JR Hokkaido – 310 yen (jōsha seiriken)
- JR East (Greater Tokyo Area) – 500 yen (Liner Ticket)
- JR East (Niigata and Nagano areas) – 310 yen (jōsha seiriken)
- JR Central – 320 yen (jōsha seiriken)(Shizuoka Area)
- JR Kyushu – 300 yen (jōsha seiriken)

== List of services ==
=== JR Hokkaido ===
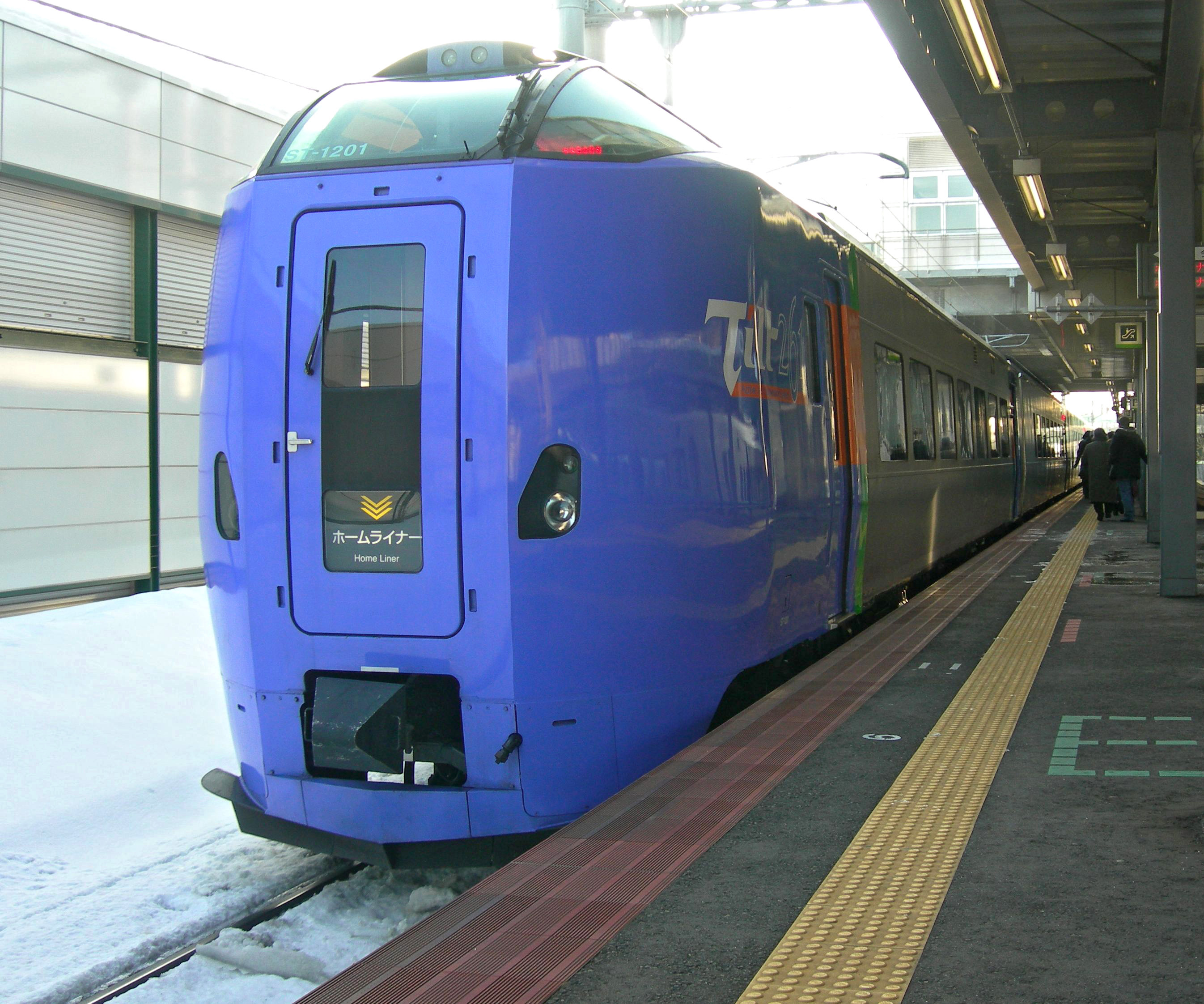
KiHa 261 series DMU on Home Liner service

Name	Line	Section	Rolling stock	Remarks
Home Liner	Hakodate Main Line	Otaru → Sapporo; Teine ↔ Sapporo	785 series 789-1000 series KiHa 261 series KiHa 281 series KiHa 283 series	Weekdays only. Supplementary fare is 100 yen to/from Teine.

=== JR East ===
Name	Line	Section	Rolling stock	Remarks
Rakuraku Train Murakami	Hakushin Line - Uetsu Main Line	Niigata → Murakami	E653-1000 series	
Rakuraku Train Shin'etsu	Shin'etsu Main Line	Niigata → Naoetsu	E653-1100 series	

=== JR Central ===
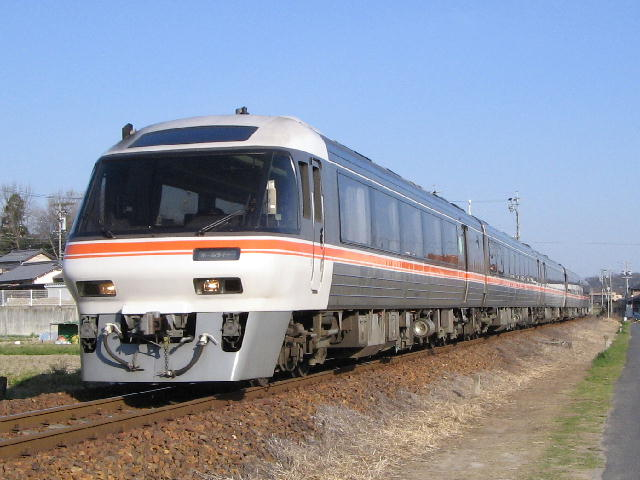
KiHa 85 series DMU on a Home Liner Taita service

Name	Line	Section	Rolling stock	Remarks
Nagoya
Home Liner Toyohashi	Tōkaidō Main Line	Ōgaki/Nagoya → Toyohashi	373 series	Weekdays only.
Home Liner Ōgaki	Tōkaidō Main Line	Ōgaki → Nagoya; Toyohashi → Ōgaki	683 series 373 series	
Home Liner Sekigahara	Tōkaidō Main Line	Nagoya → Sekigahara	683 series	Weekday evenings only.
Home Liner Nakatsugawa	Chūō Main Line	Nagoya → Nakatsugawa	383 series 313-8000 series	Weekday evenings only.
Home Liner Tajimi	Chūō Main Line -	Tajimi → Nagoya	383 series	Weekday mornings only.
Home Liner Mizunami	Chūō Main Line	Mizunami → Nagoya	383 series	Weekday mornings only.
Home Liner Taita	Chūō Main Line - Taita Line	Nagoya - Mino-Ōta	KiHa 85 series	Weekday and Saturday mornings only.
Home Liner Yokkaichi	Kansai Main Line	Yokkaichi → Nagoya	KiHa 85 series	Weekday mornings only.
Shizuoka
Home Liner Numazu	Tōkaidō Main Line	Shizuoka → Numazu	373 series	
Home Liner Hamamatsu	Tōkaidō Main Line	Numazu/Shizuoka → Hamamatsu	373 series	Weekday evenings only.
Home Liner Shizuoka	Tōkaidō Main Line	Numazu/Hamamatsu → Shizuoka	373 series	

=== JR Kyushu ===
Name	Line	Section	Rolling stock	Remarks
Sawayaka Liner	Kagoshima Main Line	Sendai → Kagoshima-Chūō	485 series	incorporated into a limited express service in 2011, which was discontinued in 2016
Sawayaka Liner	Nippō Main Line - Nichinan Line - Miyazaki Kūkō Line	Nobeoka → Miyazaki-Kūkō, Miyakonojō → Miyazaki	783 series, 485 series	discontinued in 2011
Home Liner	Kagoshima Main Line	Kagoshima-Chūō → Sendai	485 series	incorporated into a limited express service in 2011, which was discontinued in 2016
Home Liner	Nippō Main Line - Nichinan Line - Miyazaki Kūkō Line	Miyazaki-Kūkō → Nobeoka, Miyazaki → Miyakonojō	485 series	discontinued in 2011

=== Private railways ===
Name	Line	Section	Rolling stock	Remarks
Keikyu
Keikyu Wing; Morning Wing	Keikyū Main Line	Shinagawa → Keikyū Kurihama/Misakiguchi; Miurakaigan → Shinagawa/Sengakuji	2100 series	Weekdays only. Supplementary fare is 300 yen.
Keisei Electric Railway
Morningliner; Eveningliner	Keisei Main Line	Keisei Ueno ↔ Narita Airport/Keisei Narita	AE series	Supplementary fare is 410 yen.
Extra Liner	Hokusō Line; Keisei Main Line	Inba-Nihon-Idai → Keisei Ueno	AE series	Weekdays only. Supplementary fare is 500 yen.
Keio
Keio Liner	Keiō Line Keio Sagamihara Line	Shinjuku → Keiō-Hachioji Shinjuku → Hashimoto	Keio 5000 series	Supplementary fare is 400 yen.
Tobu Railway
TJ Liner	Tōbu Tōjō Line	Ikebukuro ↔ Shinrinkōen/Ogawamachi	50090 series	For the morning up services, supplementary fare is 310 yen for passengers boarding at Fujimino, and 410 yen for passengers boarding before Fujimino. For the evening down services, the 310 yen supplementary fare is charged from Ikebukuro only, and no supplementary ticket is necessary from Fujimino onwards.
TH Liner	Tōbu Skytree Line, Tokyo Metro Hibiya Line	Kuki ↔ Kasumigaseki/Ebisu	70090 series	Entered service on 6 June 2020. Service is provided from Kuki to Ebisu on morning up services, and from Kasumigaseki to Kuki on evening down services. Supplementary fare is 580 yen between the Hibiya Line stations and Sengenai (300 yen for children) and 680 yen for service to and from stations further out as far as Kuki (350 yen for children).
Seibu Railway/Tokyo Metro/Tokyu Corporation
S-Train	Seibu Chichibu Line, Seibu Ikebukuro Line, Seibu Yūrakuchō Line, Tokyo Metro Yūrakuchō Line, Tokyo Metro Fukutoshin Line, Tokyu Toyoko Line, and Minatomirai Line	Seibu-Chichibu ↔ Motomachi-Chūkagai; Tokorozawa ↔ Toyosu	Seibu 40000 series	Weekday services operate between Tokorozawa and Toyosu; weekend services operate between Seibu-Chichibu and Motomachi-Chūkagai. Seat reservation fee charged.
Haijima Liner	Seibu Shinjuku Line; Seibu Haijima Line	Seibu-Shinjuku ↔ Haijima	Seibu 40000 series	Supplementary fare is 300 yen.
Keihan Railway
Liner	Keihan Main Line; Keihan Ōtō Line	Yodoyabashi ↔ Demachiyanagi	Keihan 8000 series	Weekdays only. Supplementary fare is 380 yen between Yodoyabashi through Kyobashi and Chūshojima through Demachiyanagi, or 300 yen for other segments.
