= Tsukinowa Station =

Railway station in Namegawa, Saitama Prefecture, Japan

TJ31 Tsukinowa Station つきのわ駅
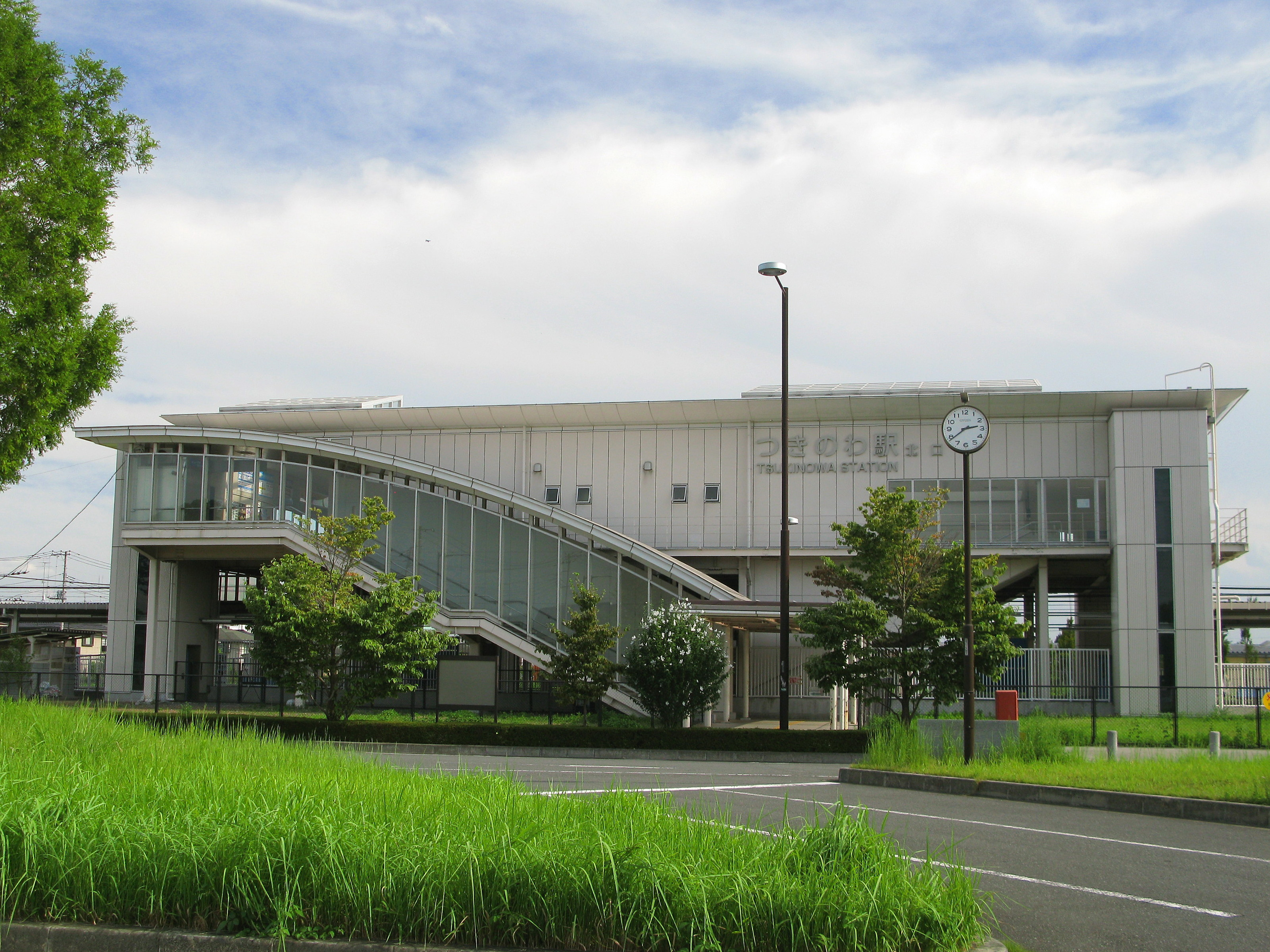
- The north side of the station in September 2012

General information
- Location: 1-1-1 Tsukinowa, Namegawa-machi, Hiki-gun, Saitama-ken 355-0815; Japan
- Coordinates: 36.0434°N 139.3458°E
- Operator: Tōbu Railway
- Line: Tōbu Tōjō Line
- Distance: 55.4 km from Ikebukuro
- Platforms: 2 side platforms
- Tracks: 2

Construction
- Structure type: Ground level
- Accessible: Yes

Other information
- Station code: TJ-31
- Website: Official website

History
- Opened: 26 March 2002

Passengers
- FY2019: 5,352 daily

Services
Preceding station	Tobu Railway	Following station
Musashi-Ranzan TJ32 towards Ogawamachi	TJ Liner	Shinrin-kōen TJ30 towards Ikebukuro
Musashi-Ranzan TJ32 towards Ogawamachi	Kawagoe	Shinrin-kōen TJ30 towards Ikebukuro
Musashi-Ranzan TJ32 towards Ogawamachi	F Liner	Shinrin-kōen TJ30 towards Motomachi-Chūkagai
Musashi-Ranzan TJ32 towards Yorii	Tojo Line Rapid Express Express Semi Express Local	Shinrin-kōen TJ30 towards Ikebukuro
Location
- Location within Saitama Prefecture Location within Japan

Tsukinowa Station (つきのわ駅, Tsukinowa-eki) is a passenger railway station located in the town of Namegawa, Saitama, Japan, operated by the private railway operator Tōbu Railway.

== Lines ==
Tsukinowa station is served by the Tōbu Tōjō Line from Ikebukuro in Tokyo. Located between Shinrinkōen and Musashi-Ranzan, it is 55.4 km from the Ikebukuro terminus. All services, (TJ Liner, Kawagoe Limited Express, Rapid Express, Express, Semi Express, Local) stop at this station. During the daytime, the station is served by two Local trains per hour operating between Yorii and Shinrin-kōen. During weekends and holidays, three trains, including two F Liner trains, run via the Tokyo Metro Fukutoshin Line, Tōkyū Tōyoko Line, and Minatomirai Line to Motomachi-Chūkagai.

== Station layout ==
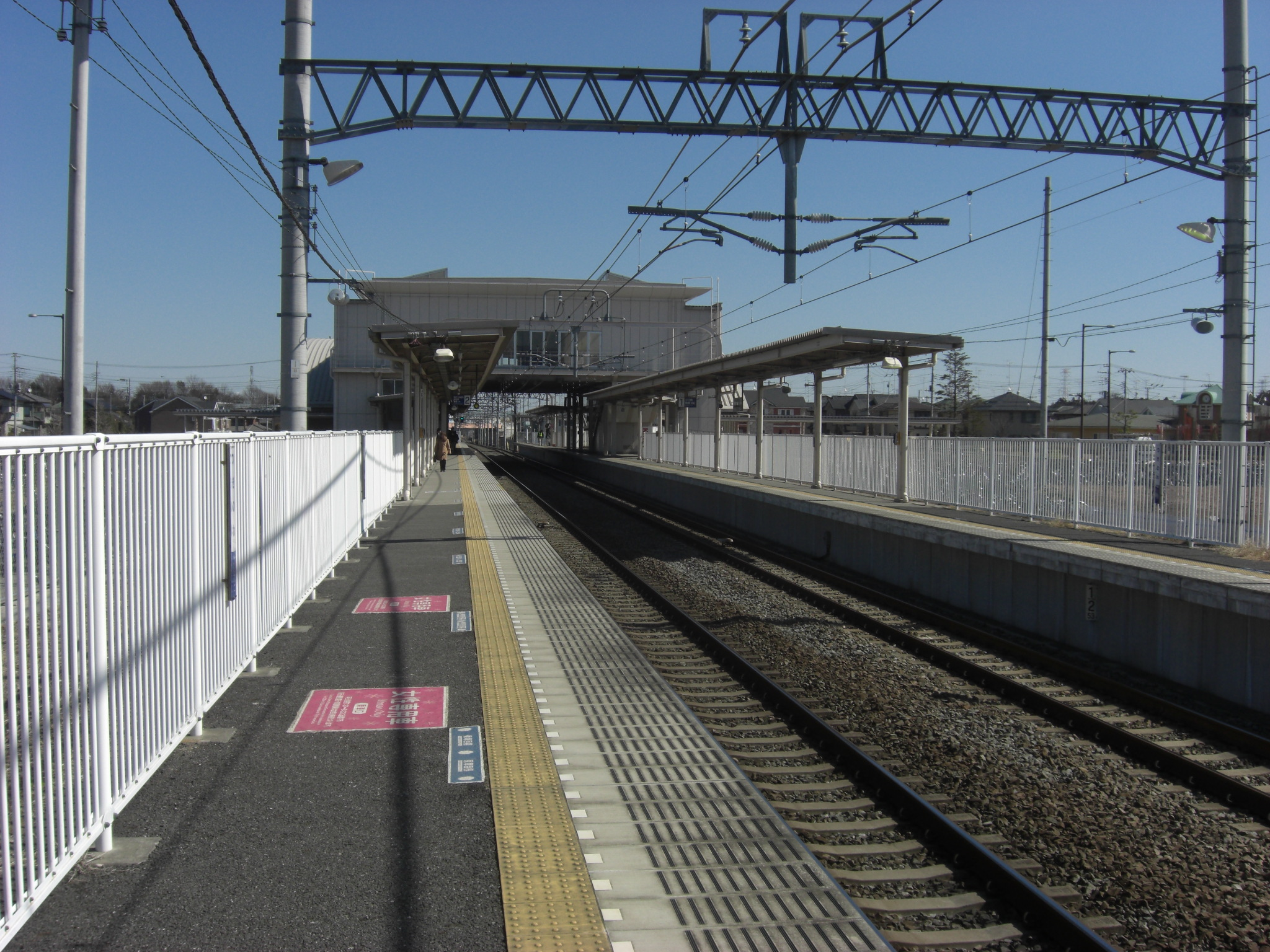
The platforms in March 2008

The station consists of two side platforms serving two tracks.

=== Platforms ===
1	Tōbu Tōjō Line	for Musashi-Ranzan and Ogawamachi
2	Tōbu Tōjō Line	for Kawagoe, Wakōshi, and Ikebukuro; Tokyo Metro Fukutoshin Line for Shibuya; Tōkyū Tōyoko Line for Yokohama; Minatomirai Line for Motomachi-Chukagai

== History ==
The station opened on 26 March 2002.

From 17 March 2012, station numbering was introduced on the Tōbu Tōjō Line, with Tsukinowa Station becoming "TJ-31".

== Passenger statistics ==
In fiscal 2019, the station was used by an average of 5,352 passengers daily.

== Surrounding area ==
- Saitama Prefectural Namegawa Comprehensive High School
- Namegawa Municipal Tsukinowa Elementary School

== See also ==
- List of railway stations in Japan
