= National Government Parks =

Japan's National Government Parks (国営公園, Kokuei Kōen) are parks or open spaces established by the Ministry of Land, Infrastructure, Transport and Tourism under the City Park Law (都市公園法, Toshi Kōen-hō).

These parks are different from the country's network of National Parks, which represent areas of outstanding natural significance and are declared by the Minister of the Environment under the Natural Park Law (自然公園法, Shizen Kōen-hō).

== History ==
The first National Government Park, Musashi Kyūryō National Government Park, was started in 1968 to commemorate the hundredth anniversary of the Meiji Restoration. The park opened its door to the public in July, 1974.

== Parks ==
In total there are seventeen National Government Parks, listed below in chronological order:

- Musashi Kyūryō National Government Park, opened in 1974
- Asuka Historical National Government Park opened in 1974 (includes also the Nara Palace Site Historical Park)
- Yodogawa River National Government Park opened in 1977.
- Uminonakamichi Seaside National Government Park opened in 1981.
- Okinawa Commemorative National Government Park opened in 1976.
- Showa Commemorative National Government Park opened in 1983.
- Takino Suzuran Hillside National Government Park opened in 1983.
- Hitachi Seaside Park opened in 1991
- Kiso Sansen National Government Park opened in 1987
- Michinoku Forest Lakeside National Government Park opened in 1989.
- Bihoku Hillside National Government Park opened in 1995.
- Sanuki Mannō National Government Park opened in 1998.
- Echigo Hillside National Government Park opened in 1998.
- Alps Azumino National Government Park opened in 2004.
- Yoshinogari Historical National Government Park opened in 2001.
- Akashi Kaikyō National Government Park opened in 2002.
- Tokyo Waterfront Wide Area Disaster Reduction National Government Park is under construction.
