= Namegawa =

Namegawa 滑川町
- Town
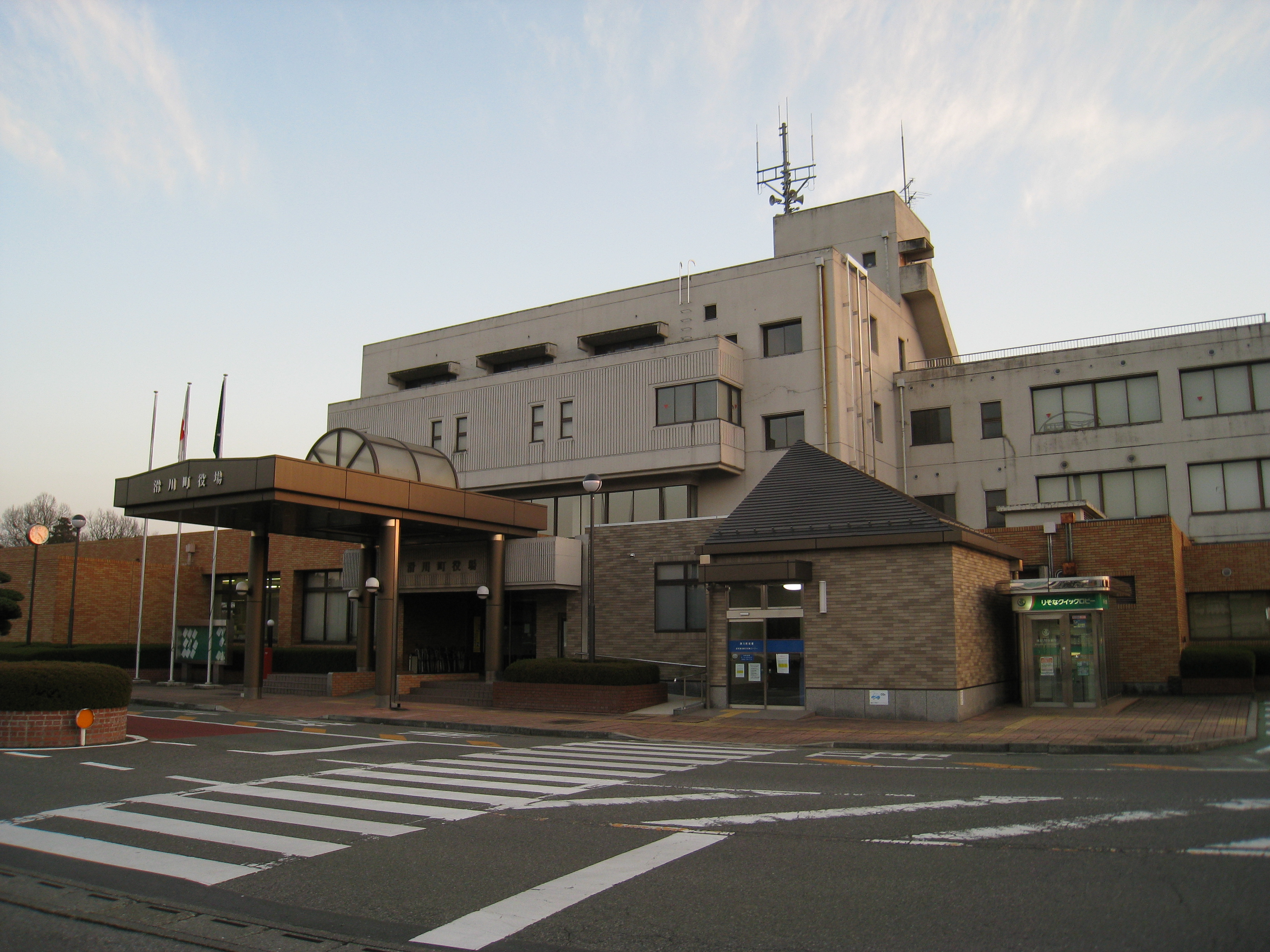
- Namegawa town office

- Flag Seal

- Location of Namegawa in Saitama Prefecture

- Coordinates: 36°3′57.6″N 139°21′39.5″E
- Country: Japan
- Region: Kantō
- Prefecture: Saitama
- District: Hiki

Area
  - Total: 29.68 km^{2} (11.46 sq mi)

Population (March 2021)
  - Total: 19,594
  - Density: 660.2/km^{2} (1,710/sq mi)
- Time zone: UTC+9 (Japan Standard Time)
- Tree: Pine
- Flower: Azalea
- Bird: Green pheasant
- Phone number: 0493-56-2211
- Address: 750-1 Fukuda, Namekawa-machi, Hiki-gun, Saitama-ken 355-8585
- Website: Official website

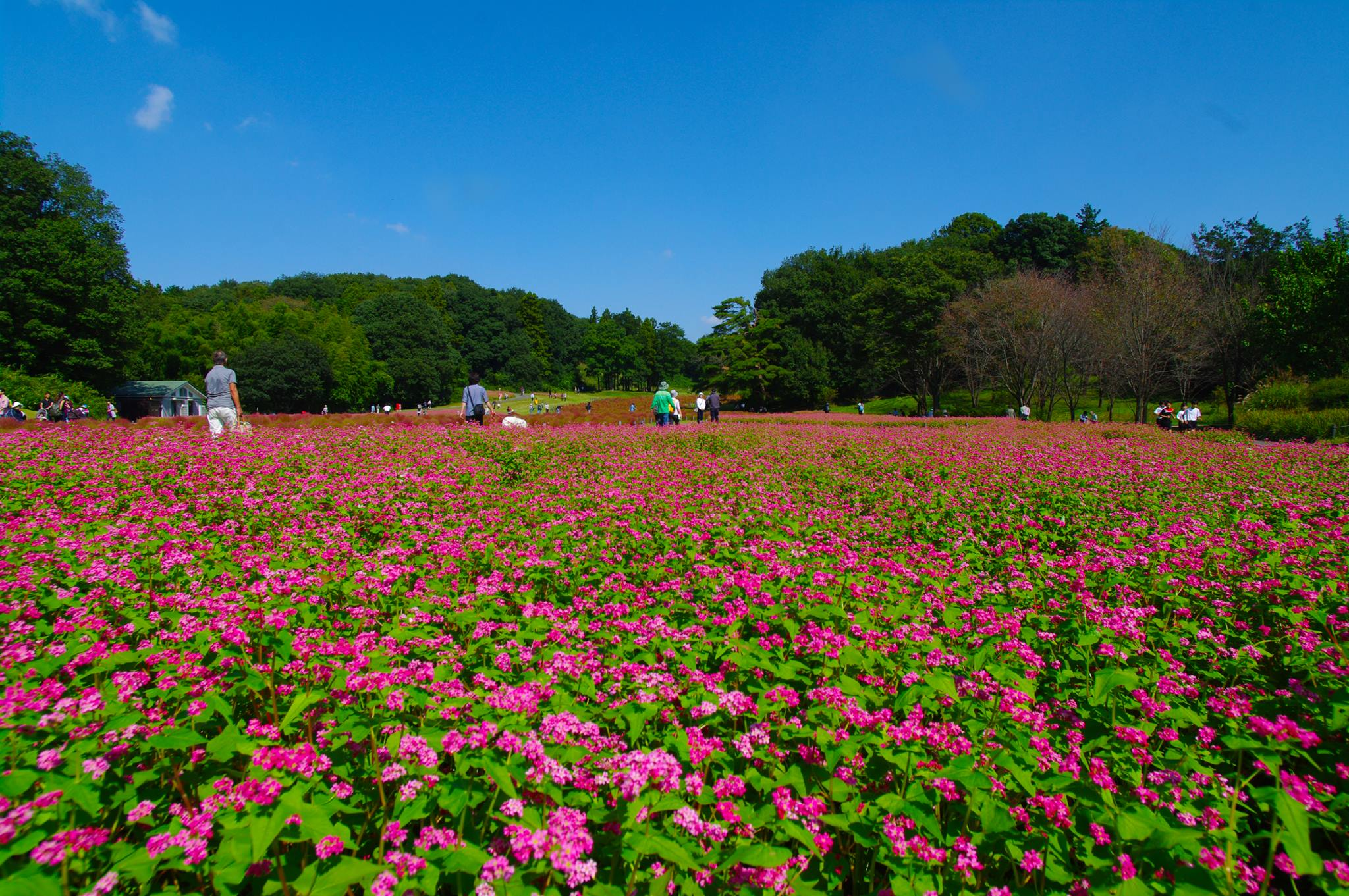
Musashi Kyūryō National Government Park

Namegawa (滑川町, Namegawa-machi) is a town located in Saitama Prefecture, Japan. As of 1 January 2021, the town had an estimated population of 19,594 in 8029 households and a population density of 660 persons per km^{2}. The total area of the town is 29.68 square kilometres (11.46 sq mi).

== Geography ==
Namegawa is located in a hilly region of central Saitama Prefecture, approximately 60 kilometers from central Tokyo. The city measures 7.2 kilometers from north-to-south by 4.8 kilometers from east-to-west, and consists of a mixture of plateaus and hills, with an elevation of 30 to 130 meters above sea level. The Wada River runs near the border with Kumagaya at the northern end of the town, the Ichino River runs in the southern part of the town, and Namegawa (after which the town is named) runs almost through the center.

=== Surrounding municipalities ===
Saitama Prefecture

- Higshimatsuyama
- Kumagaya
- Ranzan

=== Climate ===
Namegawa has a humid subtropical climate (Köppen Cfa) characterized by warm summers and cool winters with light to no snowfall. The average annual temperature in Namegawa is 14.3 °C. The average annual rainfall is 1746 mm with September as the wettest month. The temperatures are highest on average in August, at around 26.0 °C, and lowest in January, at around 2.7 °C.

== Demographics ==
Per Japanese census data, the population of Namegawa has increased by roughly 150 percent over the past half century.

Historical population
Year	Pop.	±%
1920	6,545	—
1930	6,924	+5.8%
1940	7,130	+3.0%
1950	8,418	+18.1%
1960	7,785	−7.5%
1970	7,505	−3.6%
1980	9,295	+23.9%
1990	11,566	+24.4%
2000	12,836	+11.0%
2010	17,323	+35.0%
2020	19,732	+13.9%

== History ==
The village of Namegawa was created on November 3, 1954, by the merger of the villages of Fukuda and Miyamae in Hiki District, Saitama. It was elevated to town status on November 3, 1984. Proposals to merge Namegawa with one or more of its neighbors have been made in 2003, 2004, 2007 and 2008 without success.

== Government ==
Namegawa has a mayor-council form of government with a directly elected mayor and a unicameral town council of 14 members. Namegawa, together with the towns of Ranzan, Ogawa and Tokigawa, contributes one member to the Saitama Prefectural Assembly. In terms of national politics, the town is part of Saitama 10th district of the lower house of the Diet of Japan.

== Economy ==
The economy of Namegawa is largely agricultural, although it is also a bedroom community to a significant percentage of the working population, who commute to nearby Saitama City or Tokyo.

== Education ==
Namegawa has three public elementary schools and one public middle school operated by the town government, and one public high school operated by the Saitama Prefectural Board of Education.

== Transportation ==
=== Railway ===
Tōbu Railway - Tōbu Tōjō Line

- Shinrinkōen – Tsukinowa

=== Highway ===
- National Route 254

== Local attractions ==
- Musashi Kyūryō National Government Park
