= Musashi-Ranzan Station =

Railway station in Ranzan, Saitama Prefecture, Japan

TJ32 Musashi-Ranzan Station 武蔵嵐山駅
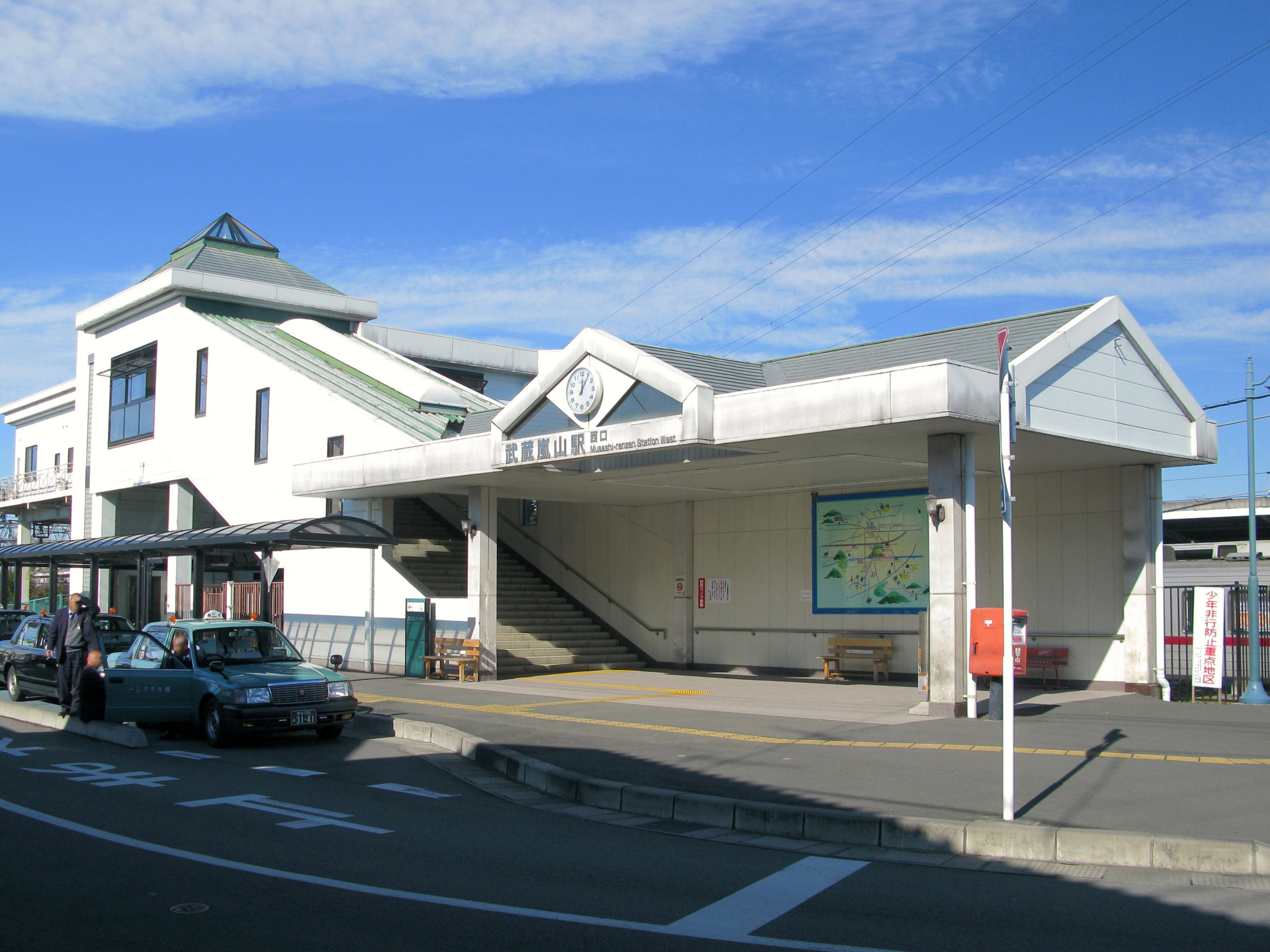
- Musashi-Ranzan Station west entrance in December 2011

General information
- Location: 135-6 Sugaya, Ranzan-machi, Hiki-gun, Saitama-ken 355-0221; Japan
- Coordinates: 36.0437°N 139.3275°E
- Operator: Tōbu Railway
- Line: Tōbu Tōjō Line
- Distance: 57.1 km from Ikebukuro
- Platforms: 1 island platform
- Tracks: 2

Construction
- Structure type: At-grade
- Accessible: Yes

Other information
- Station code: TJ-32
- Website: Official website

History
- Opened: 5 November 1923
- Former names: Sugaya (until 1935)

Passengers
- FY2019: 7278 daily

Services
Preceding station	Tobu Railway	Following station
Ogawamachi TJ33 Terminus	TJ Liner	Tsukinowa TJ31 towards Ikebukuro
Ogawamachi TJ33 Terminus	Kawagoe	Tsukinowa TJ31 towards Ikebukuro
Ogawamachi TJ33 Terminus	F Liner	Tsukinowa TJ31 towards Motomachi-Chūkagai
Ogawamachi TJ33 towards Yorii	Tojo Line Rapid Express Express Semi Express Local	Tsukinowa TJ31 towards Ikebukuro
Location
- Location within Saitama Prefecture Location within Japan

Musashi-Ranzan Station (武蔵嵐山駅, Musashi-Ranzan-eki) is a passenger railway station located in the town of Ranzan, Saitama, Japan, operated by the private railway operator Tōbu Railway.

== Lines ==
Musashi-Ranzan Station is served by the Tōbu Tōjō Line from Ikebukuro in Tokyo. Located between Tsukinowa and Ogawamachi, it is 57.1 km from the Ikebukuro terminus. All services, (TJ Liner, Kawagoe Limited Express, Rapid Express, Rapid, Express, Semi Express, Local) stop at this station. During the daytime, the station is served by two Local trains per hour operating between Yorii and Shinrin-kōen. During weekends and holidays, three trains, including two F Liner trains, run via the Tokyo Metro Fukutoshin Line, Tōkyū Tōyoko Line, and Minatomirai Line to Motomachi-Chūkagai.

== Station layout ==
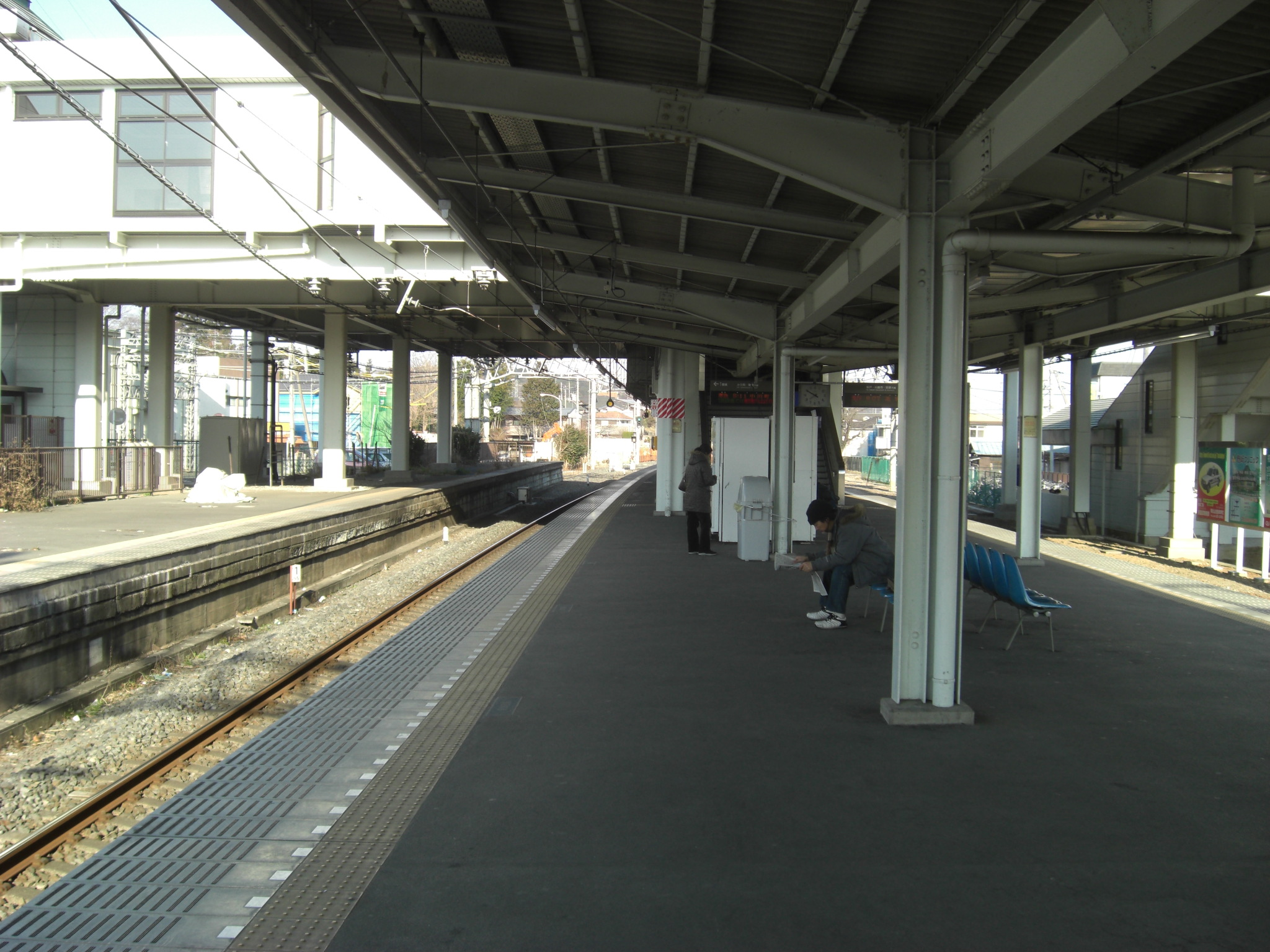
The station platform in March 2008 showing the unused side platform on the left

The station consists of an island platform serving two tracks, connected to the station building by a footbridge. An additional side platform remains on the west side of the down track, but this is no longer used.

=== Platforms ===
1	Tōbu Tōjō Line	for Ogawamachi and Yorii
2	Tōbu Tōjō Line	for Kawagoe, Wakōshi, and Ikebukuro; Tokyo Metro Fukutoshin Line for Shibuya; Tōkyū Tōyoko Line for Yokohama; Minatomirai Line for Motomachi-Chūkagai

== History ==
The station opened on 5 November 1923 as Sugaya Station (菅谷駅), and was renamed Musashi-Ranzan on 1 October 1935.

From 17 March 2012, station numbering was introduced on the Tōbu Tōjō Line, with Musashi-Ranzan Station becoming "TJ-32".

== Passenger statistics ==
In fiscal 2019, the station was used by an average of 7287 passengers daily.

== Surrounding area ==
- Ranzan Town Hall
- Sugaya Yakata, National Historic Site

== See also ==
- List of railway stations in Japan
