= TJ Liner =

Train service operated in Japan by Tobu Railway

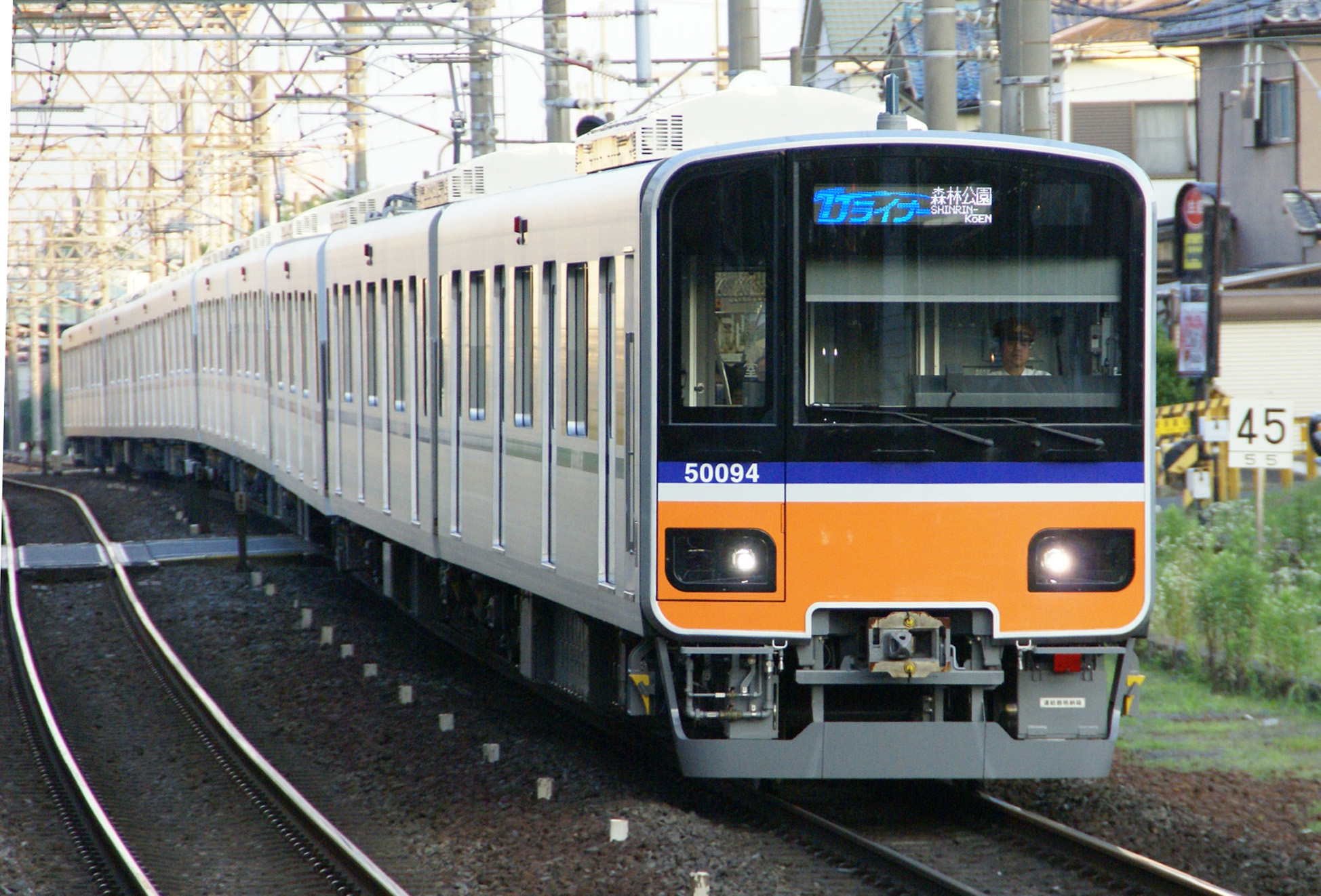
- Tobu 50090 series train on a TJ Liner service

Overview
- Service type: Home Liner
- Status: Operational
- Locale: Kanto region, Japan
- First service: 14 June 2008
- Current operator: Tobu Railway
- Ridership: 1,057,662 (FY2012)

Route
- Termini: Ikebukuro; Ogawamachi (Evening down services); Shinrinkōen (Morning up services)
- Distance travelled: 64.1 km (39.8 mi)
- Average journey time: 1 hour
- Service frequency: 15 (weekdays), 9 (weekends)
- Line used: Tobu Tojo Line

On-board services
- Class: Monoclass
- Seating arrangements: Forward facing 2+2
- Catering facilities: None
- Other facilities: 50 toilets

Technical
- Rolling stock: 50090 series EMUs
- Track gauge: 1,067 mm (3 ft 6 in)
- Electrification: 1,500 V DC overhead
- Operating speed: 100 km/h (60 mph)

The TJ Liner (TJライナー, Tī Jei Rainā) is a limited-stop "Home Liner"-style service to and from Ikebukuro Station in Tokyo on the Tobu Tojo Line operated by the private railway operator Tobu Railway in Japan since June 2008.

== Service outline ==
TJ Liner services operate in the mornings on weekdays in the "up" direction (two services) from Shinrinkōen in Saitama Prefecture to Ikebukuro in Tokyo, and in the evenings (weekdays and weekends) in the "down" direction from Ikebukuro to Shinrinkōen or Ogawamachi. In the down direction, a supplement of 310 yen is required for travel from Ikebukuro, but no supplementary fare is required for passengers boarding at other stations along the line. In the up direction, a supplement of 410 yen is required from all stations (310 yen from Fujimino). Seats are not reserved, but the supplementary tickets indicate whether passengers should ride in the front or rear five cars of the train. At Ikebukuro Station, passengers board from platform 5, which is normally used only for passengers alighting from other services.

=== Weekdays ===
Four morning up services (Nos. 2, 4, 6 and 8) operate from Shinrinkōen to Ikebukuro, departing at 06:11, 06:27, 07:52 and 08:18, respectively. In the evenings, 13 down services (Nos. 1 to 25) operate at half-hourly intervals between 18:00 and 24:00 from Ikebukuro to Ogawamachi (Nos. 23 and 25 terminate at Shinrinkoen).

=== Weekends ===
At weekends, nine evening down services (Nos. 1 to 17) operate at half-hourly intervals between 17:00 and 21:00 from Ikebukuro to Ogawamachi.

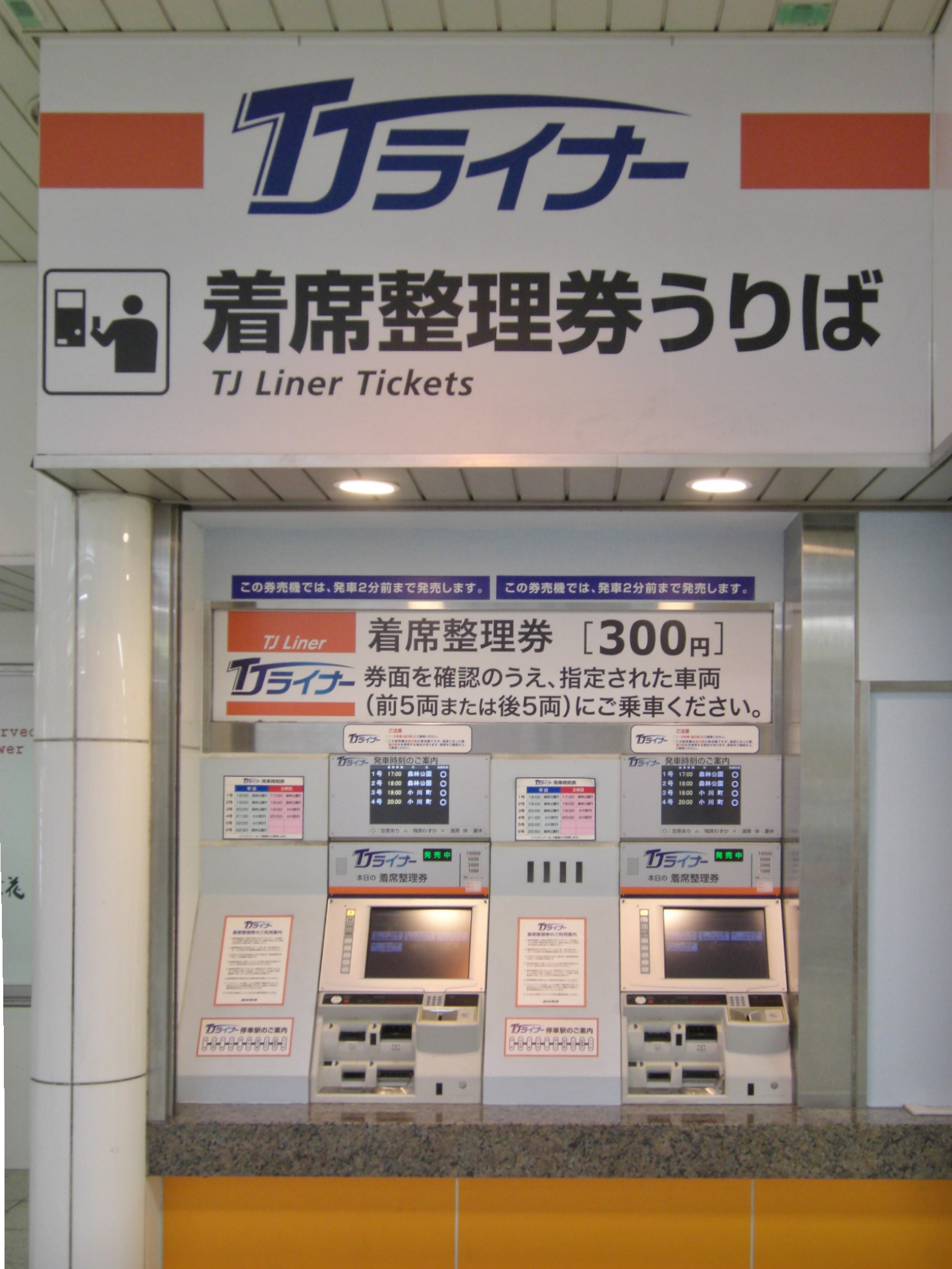
TJ Liner ticket machines at Ikebukuro Station in February 2009

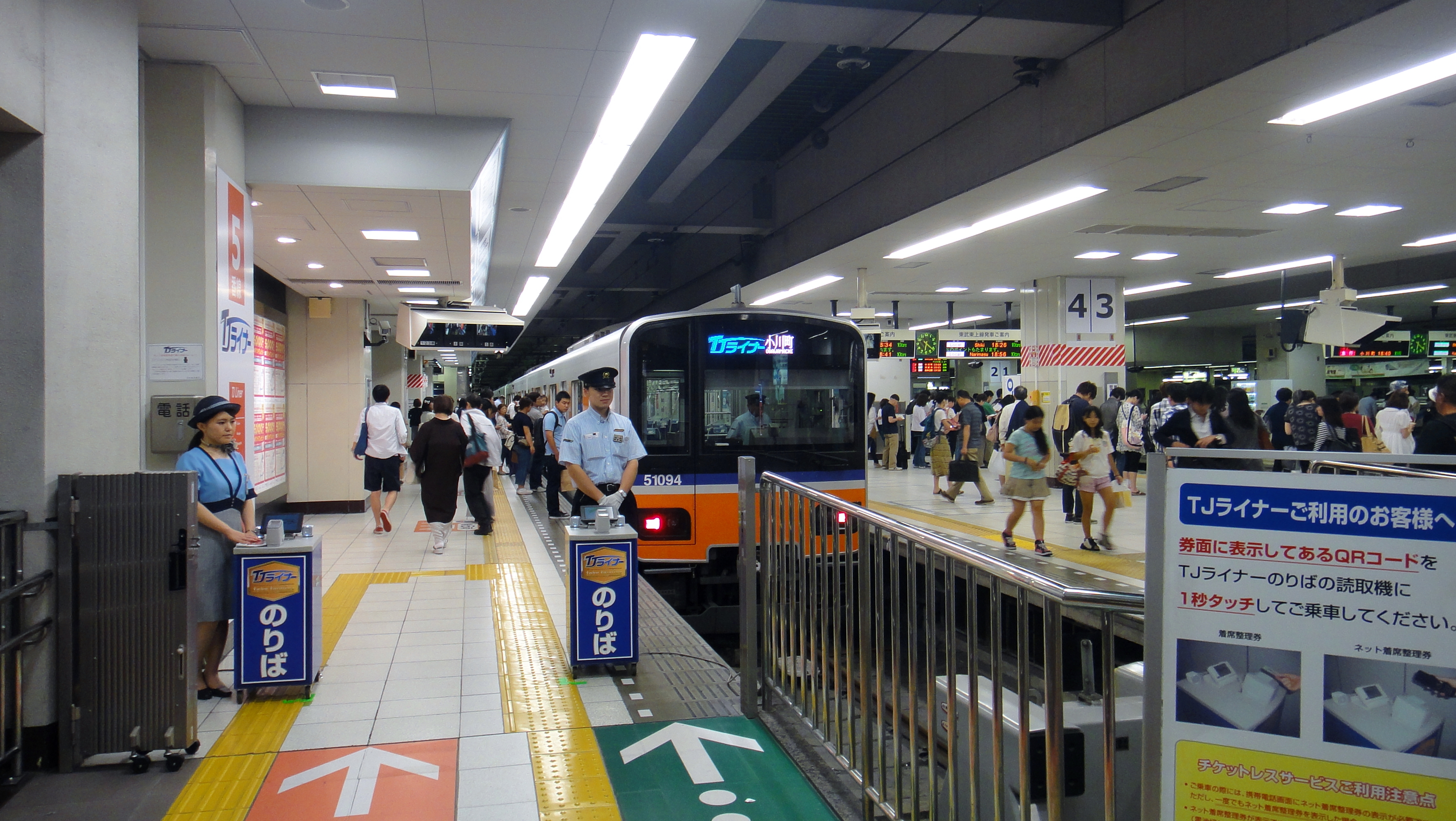
The staffed QR code ticket readers at the southern end of platform 5 at Ikebukuro Station in September 2014

== Station stops ==
TJ Liner services stop at the following stations.

- Ikebukuro - Fujimino - Kawagoe - Kawagoeshi (Note: In down direction (evenings) only.) - Sakado - Higashi-Matsuyama - Shinrinkōen - Tsukinowa - Musashi-Ranzan - Ogawamachi

== Rolling stock ==
TJ Liner services are operated by a fleet of six 50090 series 10-car electric multiple units (EMUs). These sets are unusual in having rotating pairs of seats allowing them to be used with longitudinal seating on regular daytime services, and with transverse seating on evening TJ Liner services. When configured in transverse mode, the rows have a seat pitch of 1,000 mm (39 in). Some trains are sent to Ikebukuro from Shinrinkōen as limited-stop Rapid Express services, which also operate with seats in the forward-facing configuration.

Since March 2016, the automated on-board passenger announcements in Japanese use the voice of TV presenter Tomomi Kuno.

=== Formations ===
TJ Liner trains are formed as shown below, with car 10 at the Ikebukuro end.

Car No.	1	2	3	4	5	6	7	8	9	10
Numbering	50090	59090	58090	57090	56090	55090	54090	53090	52090	51090

Cars 2 and 9 have a wheelchair space. Car 9 is designated as a mildly-air-conditioned car.

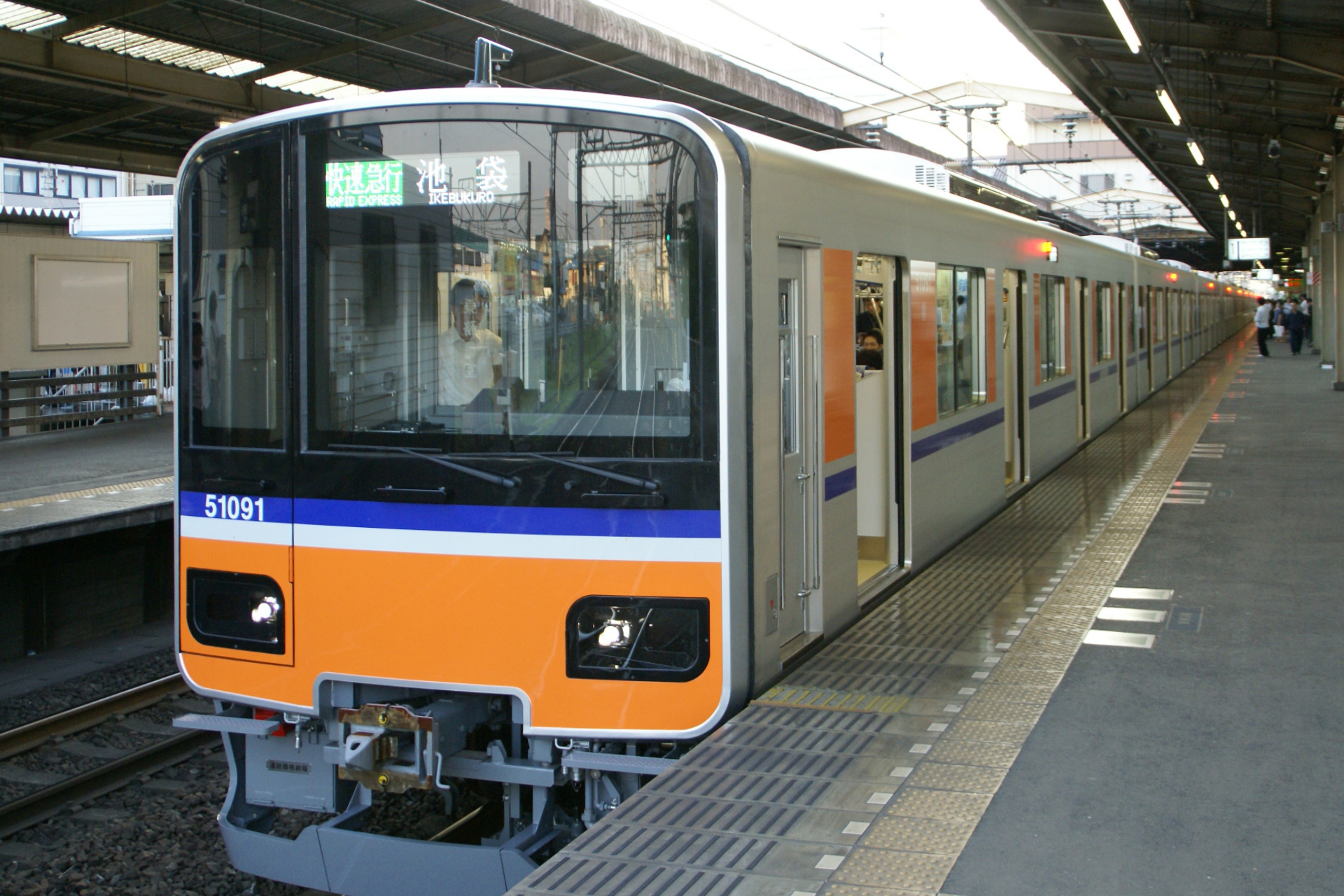
A 50090 series EMU at Kawagoe Station on an up Rapid Express service to Ikebukuro, June 2008

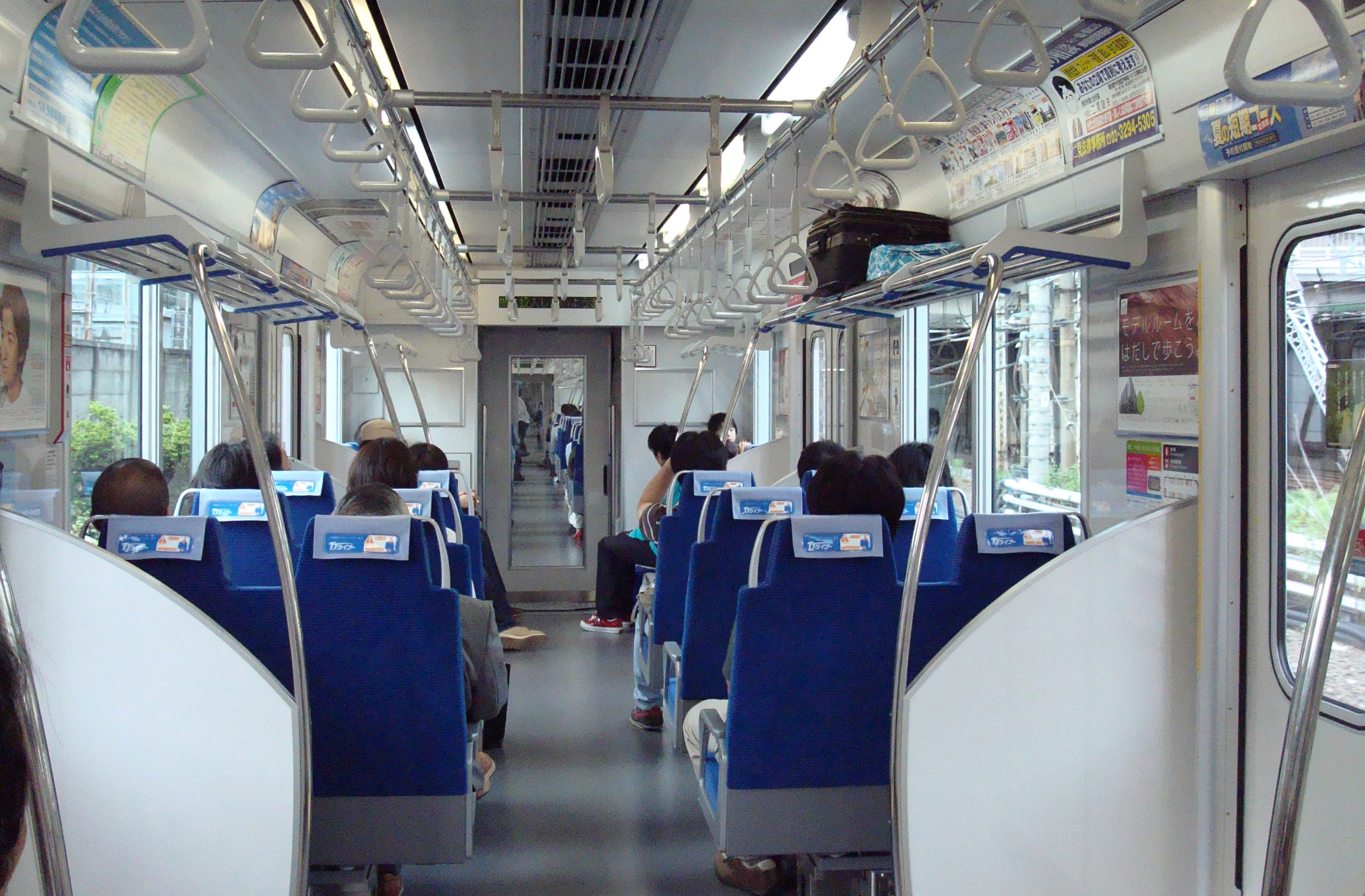
Interior of a 50090 series EMU on a TJ Liner service, showing forward-facing transverse seating configuration

== History ==
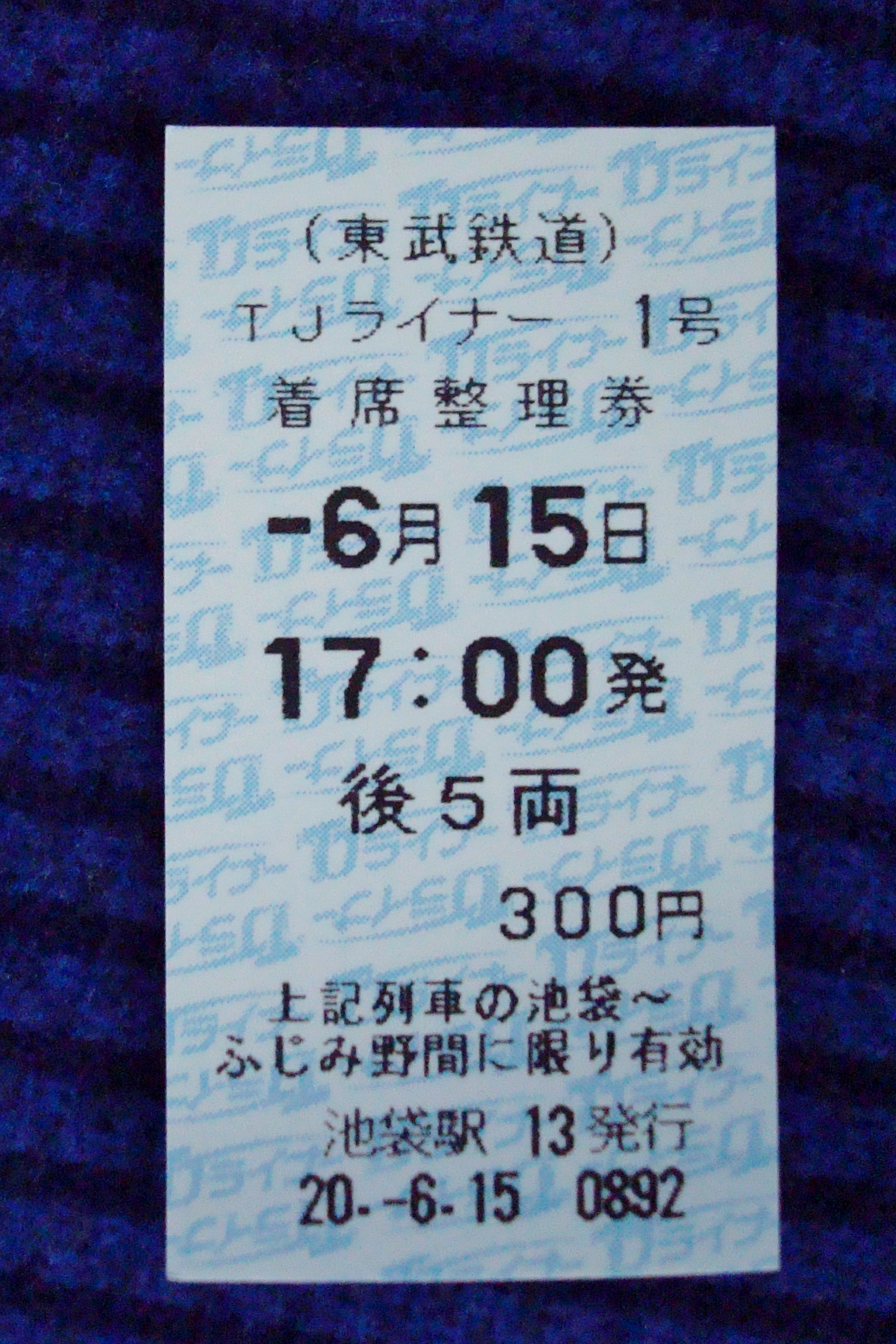
A TJ Liner ticket in June 2008 before the introduction of QR Codes

=== 2008 ===
The name "TJ Liner" was formally announced by Tobu on 28 January 2008 based on the results of a public poll conducted between December 2007 and January 2008. The votes for the three choices of possible names were as follows.

1. TJ Liner (ＴＪライナー) (4,313 votes)
2. Okaeri Liner (おかえりライナー) (3,148 votes)
3. Assist Liner (1,726 votes)
The proposed TJ Liner logo (ultimately chosen)

The proposed Okaeri Liner logo

The proposed Assist Liner logo

Services commenced from the start of the Tobu Tojo Line timetable revision on 14 June 2008, with six trains on weekdays, and four trains at weekends and holidays. The original timetable was as shown below.

Weekdays

- TJ Liner 1: Ikebukuro (18:00) to Shinrinkōen (18:47)
- TJ Liner 2: Ikebukuro (19:00) to Shinrinkōen (19:47)
- TJ Liner 3: Ikebukuro (20:00) to Shinrinkōen (20:47)
- TJ Liner 4: Ikebukuro (21:00) to Ogawamachi (22:02)
- TJ Liner 5: Ikebukuro (22:00) to Ogawamachi (23:02)
- TJ Liner 6: Ikebukuro (22:50) to Shinrinkōen (23:41)

Weekends

- TJ Liner 1: Ikebukuro (17:00) to Shinrinkōen (17:47)
- TJ Liner 2: Ikebukuro (18:00) to Shinrinkōen (18:47)
- TJ Liner 3: Ikebukuro (19:00) to Ogawamachi (20:02)
- TJ Liner 4: Ikebukuro (20:00) to Ogawamachi (21:02)

=== 2009 ===
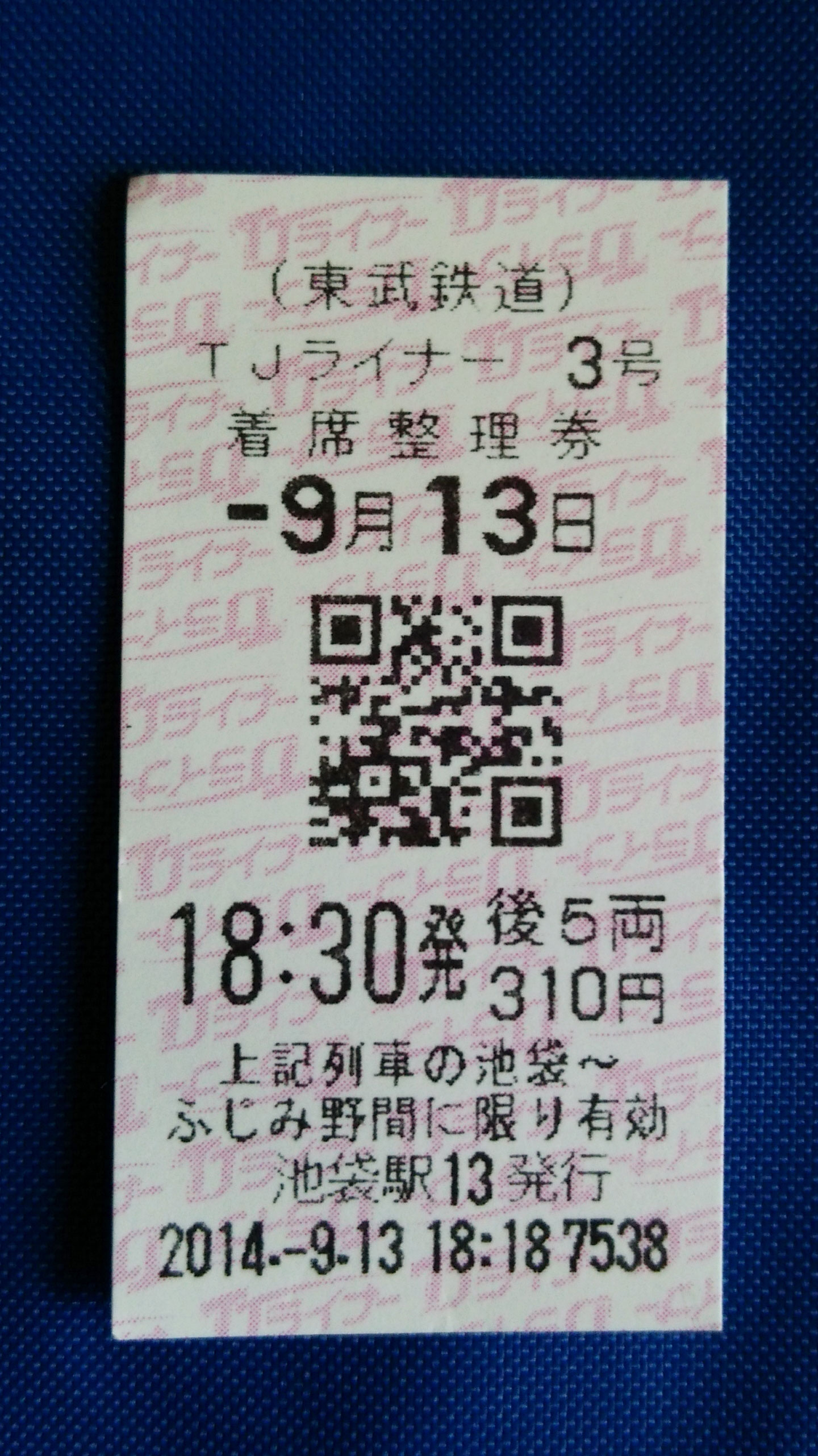
A ticket for the TJ Liner 3 service with QR Code, September 2014

From 15 September 2009, a new QR Code ticketing system was introduced for TJ Liner services. From this date, TJ Liner supplementary fare tickets were printed with a QR Code enabling them to be read by special ticket readers at Ikebukuro Station platform gates, replacing the previous manual ticket inspection by staff.

On 5 November 2009, a ceremony was held at Ikebukuro Station to celebrate the one millionth passenger to travel on the TJ Liner service.

=== 2011 ===
From the start of the revised timetable on 5 March 2011, the number of TJ Liner services operating on weekday evenings was increased from six to nine. On weekends, all services were extended to run to Ogawamachi. The timetable operated from March 2011 was as shown below.

Weekdays

- TJ Liner 1: Ikebukuro (18:00) to Shinrinkōen (18:48)
- TJ Liner 2: Ikebukuro (18:30) to Ogawamachi (19:31)
- TJ Liner 3: Ikebukuro (19:00) to Shinrinkōen (19:48)
- TJ Liner 4: Ikebukuro (19:30) to Ogawamachi (20:31)
- TJ Liner 5: Ikebukuro (20:00) to Shinrinkōen (20:48)
- TJ Liner 6: Ikebukuro (20:30) to Ogawamachi (21:32)
- TJ Liner 7: Ikebukuro (21:00) to Ogawamachi (22:02)
- TJ Liner 8: Ikebukuro (22:00) to Ogawamachi (23:02)
- TJ Liner 9: Ikebukuro (22:50) to Shinrinkōen (23:39)
- TJ Liner 10 (TJ Liner 23:10): Ikebukuro (23:20) to Shinrinkoen (00:09)

Weekends

- TJ Liner 1: Ikebukuro (17:00) to Ogawamachi (18:05)
- TJ Liner 2: Ikebukuro (18:00) to Ogawamachi (19:05)
- TJ Liner 3: Ikebukuro (19:00) to Ogawamachi (20:04)
- TJ Liner 4: Ikebukuro (20:00) to Ogawamachi (21:02)

In December 2011, an additional TJ Liner 10, nicknamed TJ Liner 23:10, operated to Shinrinkōen on Thursdays and Fridays from 8 to 22 December (a total of five days), departing from Ikebukuro Station at 23:20, 30 minutes after the last regular TJ Liner service.

=== 2013 ===
From the start of the revised timetable on 16 March 2013, an additional TJ Liner service was added on weekday evenings, departing from Ikebukuro at 21:30, and two more TJ Liner services were added on weekends, departing from Ikebukuro at 18:30 and 19:30. From this date, all TJ Liner services operated to Ogawamachi.

=== 2014 ===
On 22 January 2014, the TJ Liner service celebrated the 5 millionth passenger since the start of services in 2008.

From 1 April 2014, the TJ Liner supplement fare was raised from 300 yen to 310 yen, coinciding with the increase in Japanese consumption tax from 5% to 8%.

From July 2014, an additional late-night TJ Liner service was introduced, operating on Friday nights only, departing Ikebukuro at 23:20 for Shinrinkoen. Initially scheduled to operate until December 2014, it subsequently continued to operate every Friday.

=== 2015 ===
From 7 May 2015, the additional late-night TJ Liner service previously operating on Friday nights only was extended to also run on Thursday nights.

=== 2016 ===
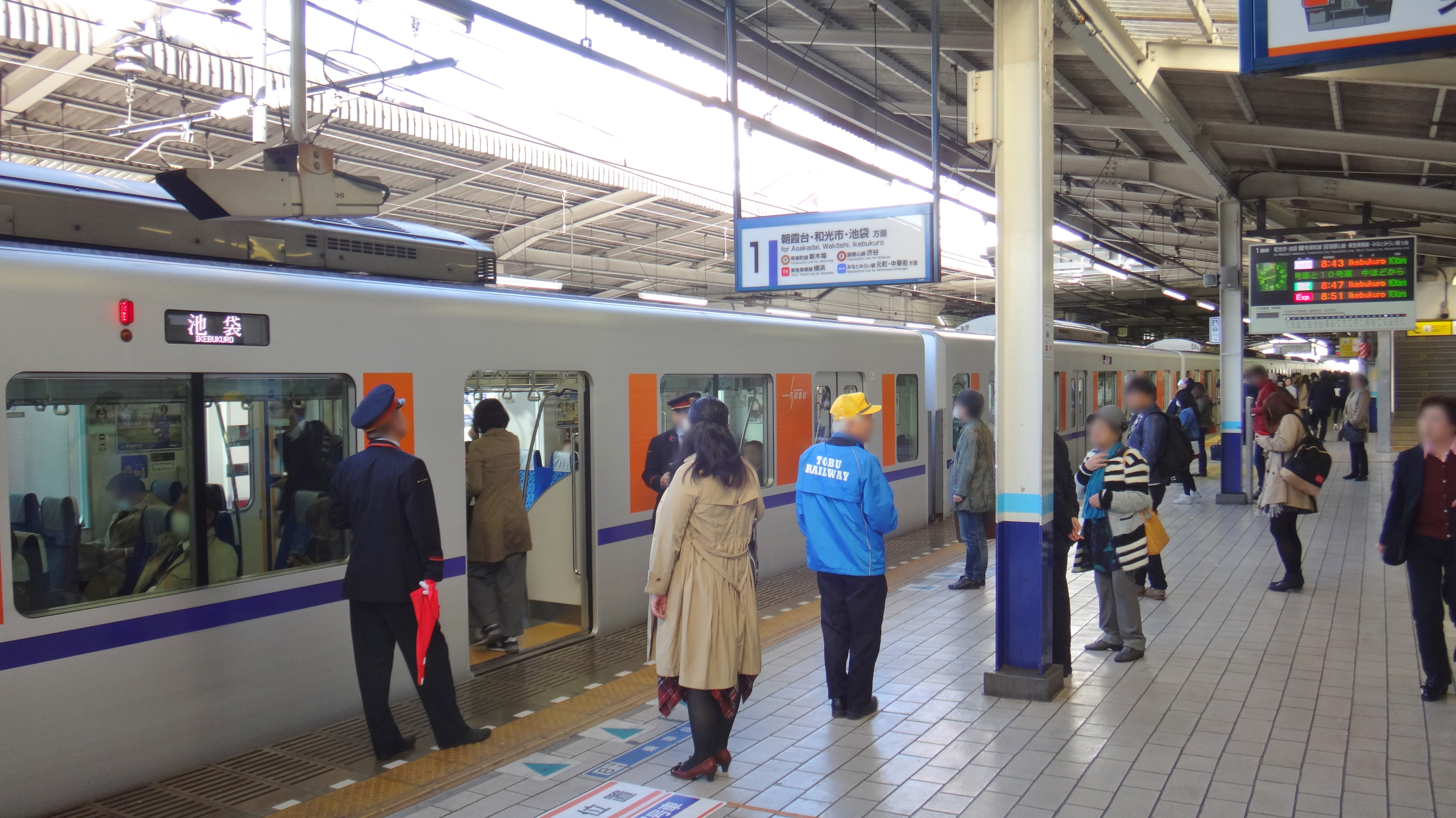
Passengers boarding the morning up TJ Liner 4 service at Kawagoe Station in March 2016

With the start of the revised timetable introduced on 26 March 2016, two weekday morning TJ Liner services were introduced in the up direction from Shinrinkoen to Ikebukuro. From the same date, the number of down services from Ikebukuro was also increased, with services operating at 30-minute intervals between 18:00 and 24:00 on weekdays, and between 17:00 and 21:00 at weekends.

== Ridership statistics ==
In fiscal 2012, TJ Liner services were used by a total of 1,057,662 passengers. Figures for previous years are as shown below.

Fiscal year	Annual total
2008	568,545
2009	717,673
2010	681,130
2011	1,015,545
2012	1,057,662

== See also ==
- TH Liner
- List of named passenger trains of Japan
