= Shinrin-kōen Station (Saitama) =

Railway station in Namegawa, Saitama Prefecture, Japan

TJ30 Shinrin-kōen Station 森林公園駅
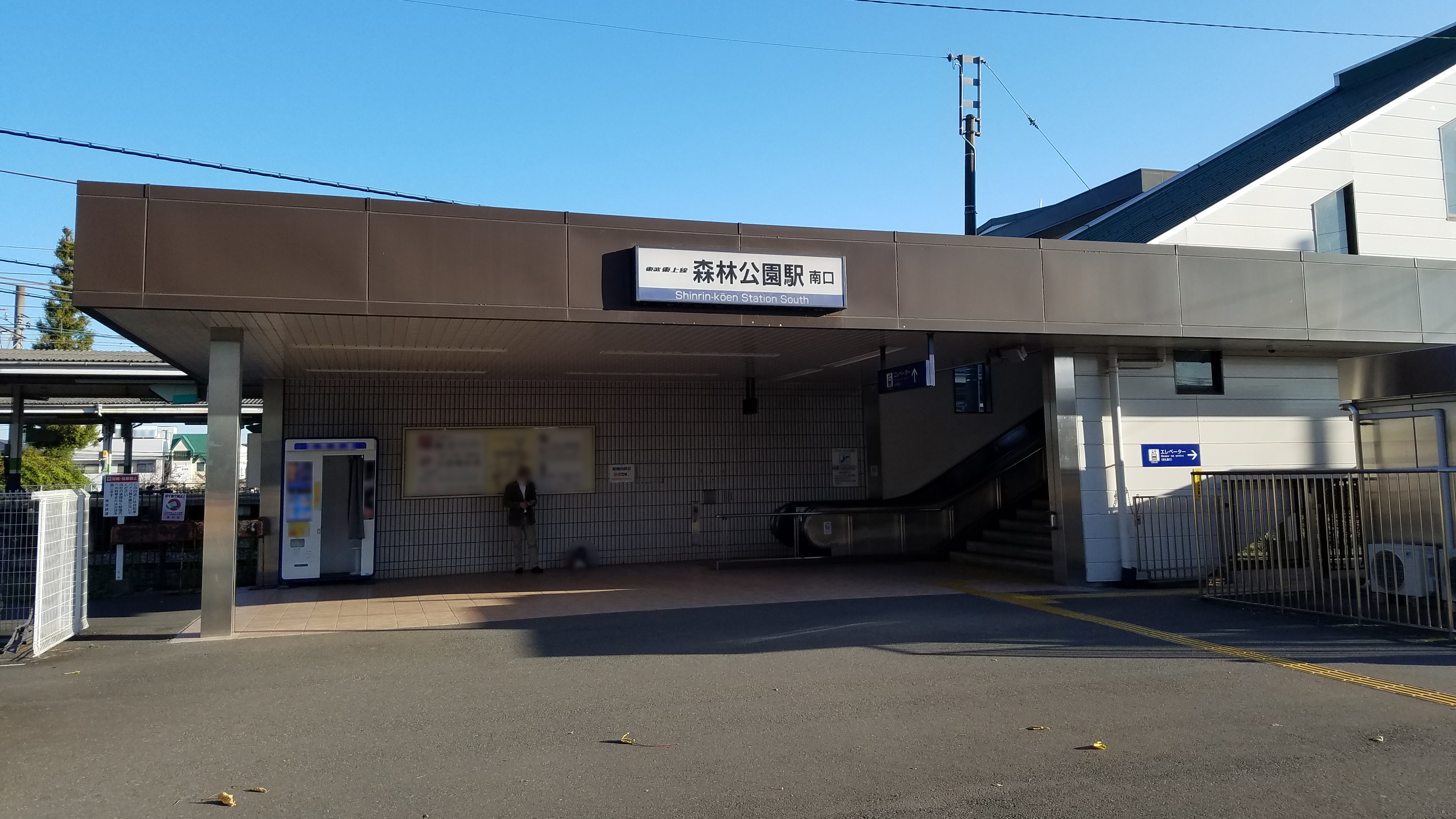
- The south entrance in November 2020

General information
- Location: 3977-1 Haneo, Namegawa-machi, Hiki-gun, Saitama-ken 355-0811; Japan
- Coordinates: 36.0452344°N 139.3749565°E
- Operator: Tōbu Railway
- Line: Tōbu Tōjō Line
- Distance: 52.6 km from Ikebukuro
- Platforms: 2 island platforms
- Tracks: 4

Construction
- Accessible: Yes

Other information
- Station code: TJ-30
- Website: Official website

History
- Opened: 1 March 1971

Passengers
- FY2019: 14,284 daily

Services
Preceding station	Tobu Railway	Following station
Tsukinowa TJ31 towards Ogawamachi	TJ Liner	Higashi-Matsuyama TJ29 towards Ikebukuro
Tsukinowa TJ31 towards Ogawamachi	Kawagoe	Higashi-Matsuyama TJ29 towards Ikebukuro
Tsukinowa TJ31 towards Ogawamachi	F Liner	Higashi-Matsuyama TJ29 towards Motomachi-Chūkagai
Tsukinowa TJ31 towards Yorii	Tojo Line Rapid Express Express Semi Express Local	Higashi-Matsuyama TJ29 towards Ikebukuro
Location
- Location within Saitama Prefecture Location within Japan

Shinrin-kōen Station (森林公園駅, Shinrin-kōen-eki) is a passenger railway station located in the town of Namegawa, Saitama, Japan, operated by the private railway operator Tōbu Railway.

== Lines ==
Shinrin-kōen Station is served by the Tōbu Tōjō Line from Ikebukuro in Tokyo. Located between Higashi-Matsuyama and Tsukinowa, it is 52.6 km from the Ikebukuro terminus. All services, (TJ Liner, Kawagoe Limited Express, Rapid Express, Rapid, Express, Semi-Express and Local) stop at this station. During the daytime, the station is served by six trains per hour in each direction.

== Station layout ==
The station consists of two island platforms serving four tracks, with the station building located above the platforms.

=== Platforms ===
1/2	Tobu Tojo Line	for Musashi-Ranzan, Ogawamachi, and Yorii
3/4	Tobu Tojo Line	for Higashi-Matsuyama, Kawagoe, and Ikebukuro; Tokyo Metro Yurakucho Line for Shin-Kiba; Tokyo Metro Fukutoshin Line for Shibuya; Tōkyū Tōyoko Line for Hiyoshi and Yokohama; Tōkyū Shin-Yokohama Line for Shin-Yokohama via Sōtetsu Shin-Yokohama Line for Shōnandai; Minatomirai Line for Motomachi-Chukagai

=== Facilities and accessibility ===
Toilet facilities are located on both platforms. Escalator (up only) and lift access is provided to and from the platforms.

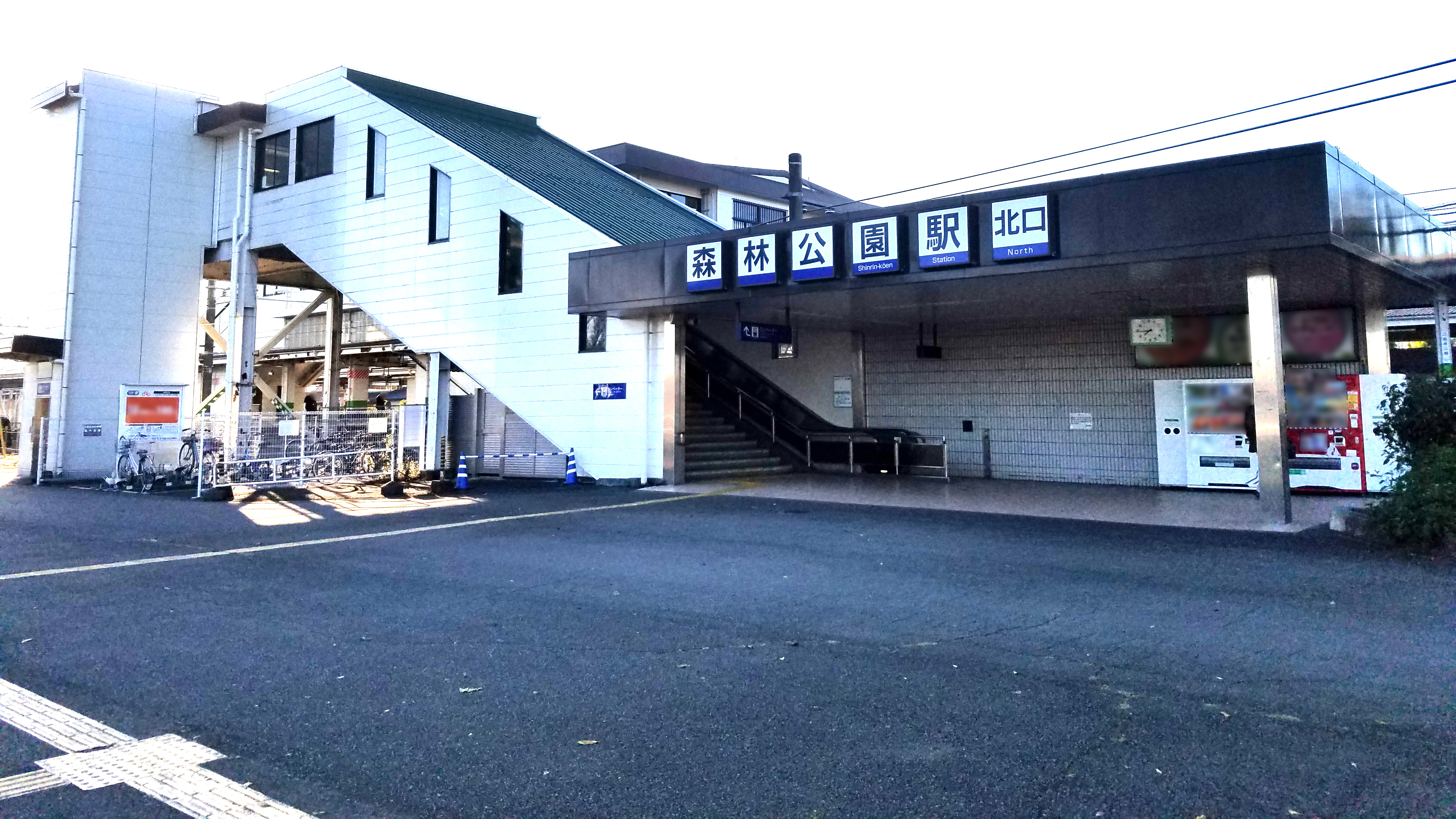
The north entrance in November 2020

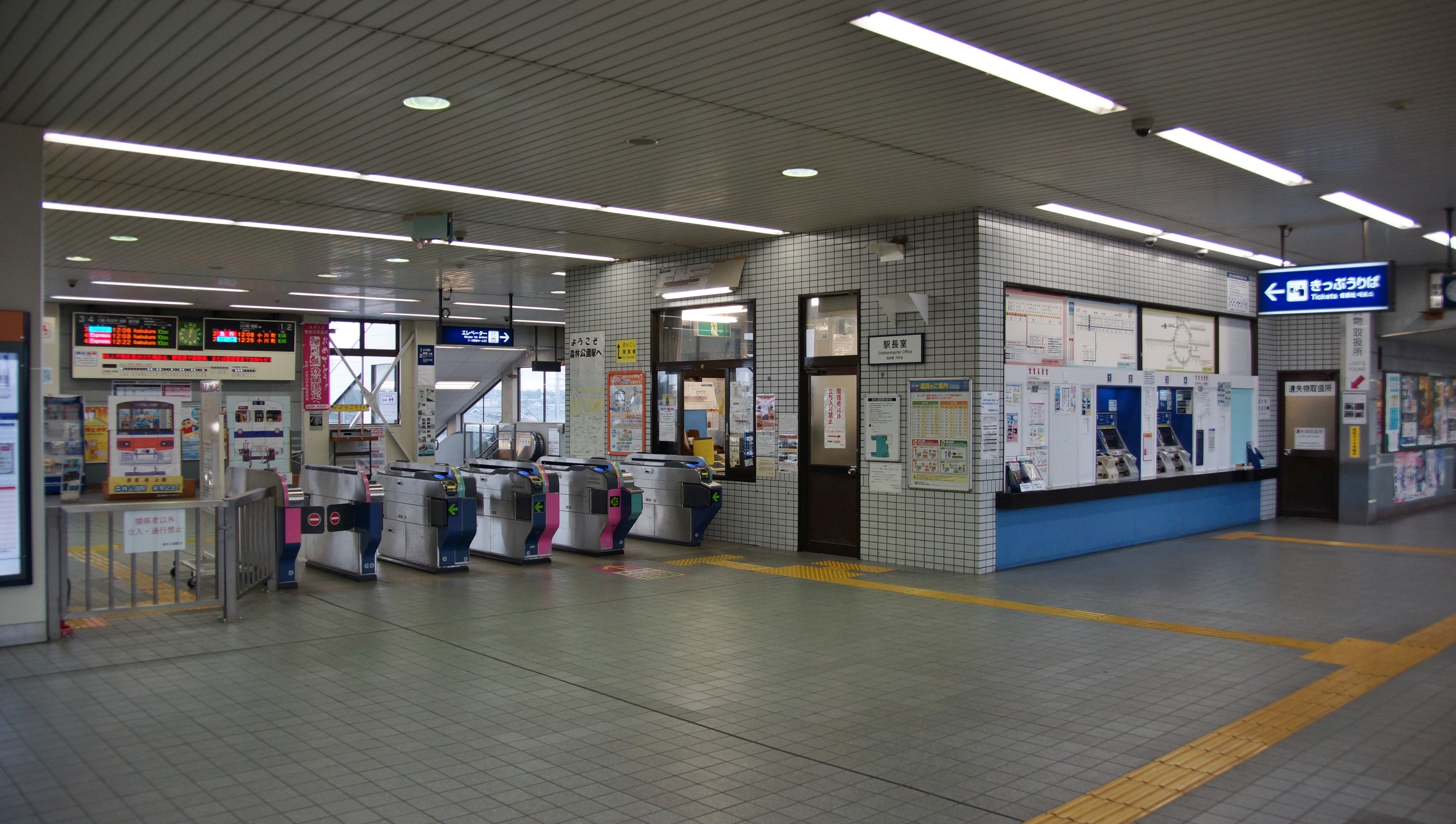
The ticket barriers, November 2015

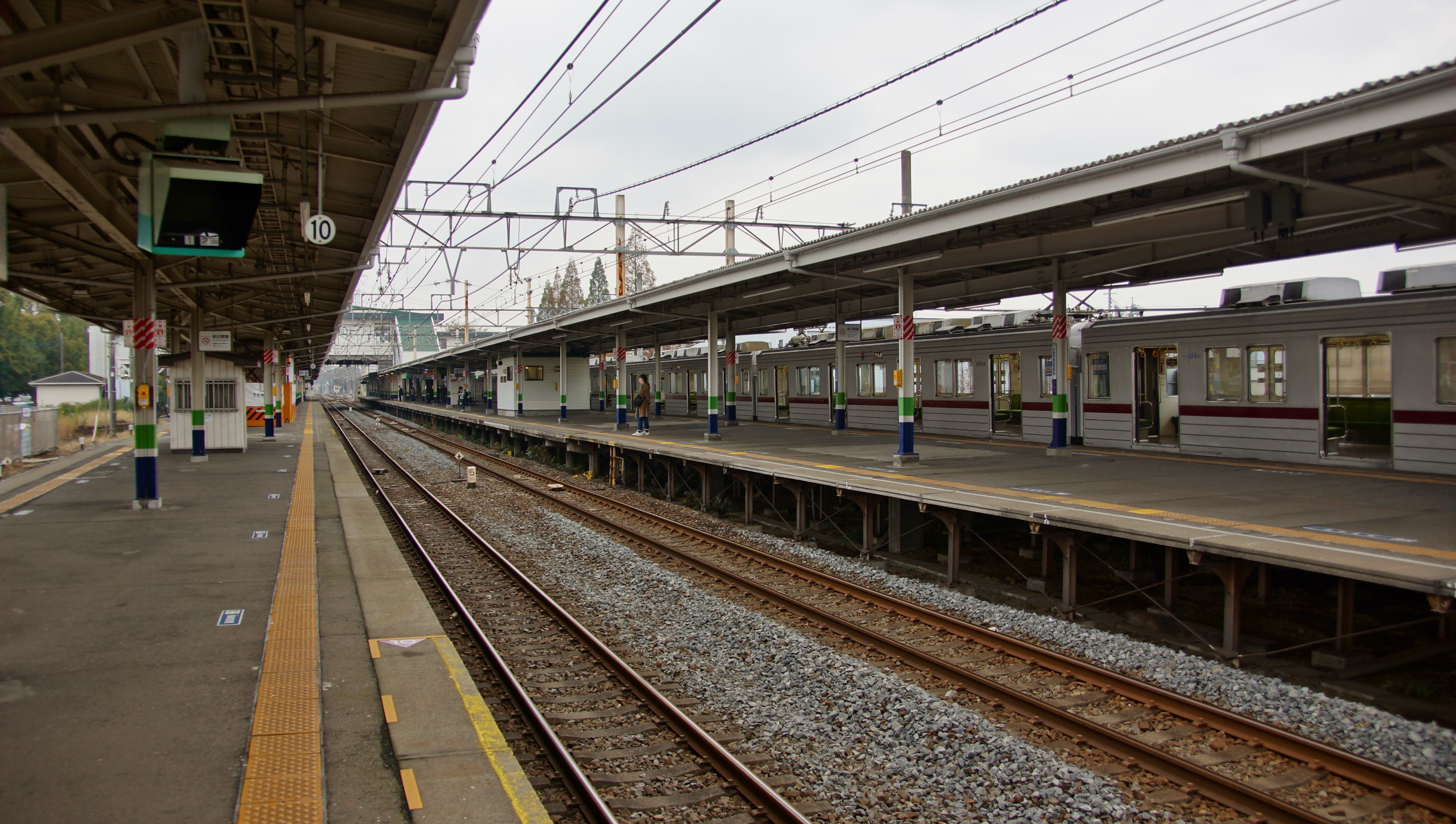
The view from the up end of platform 1/2 in November 2015

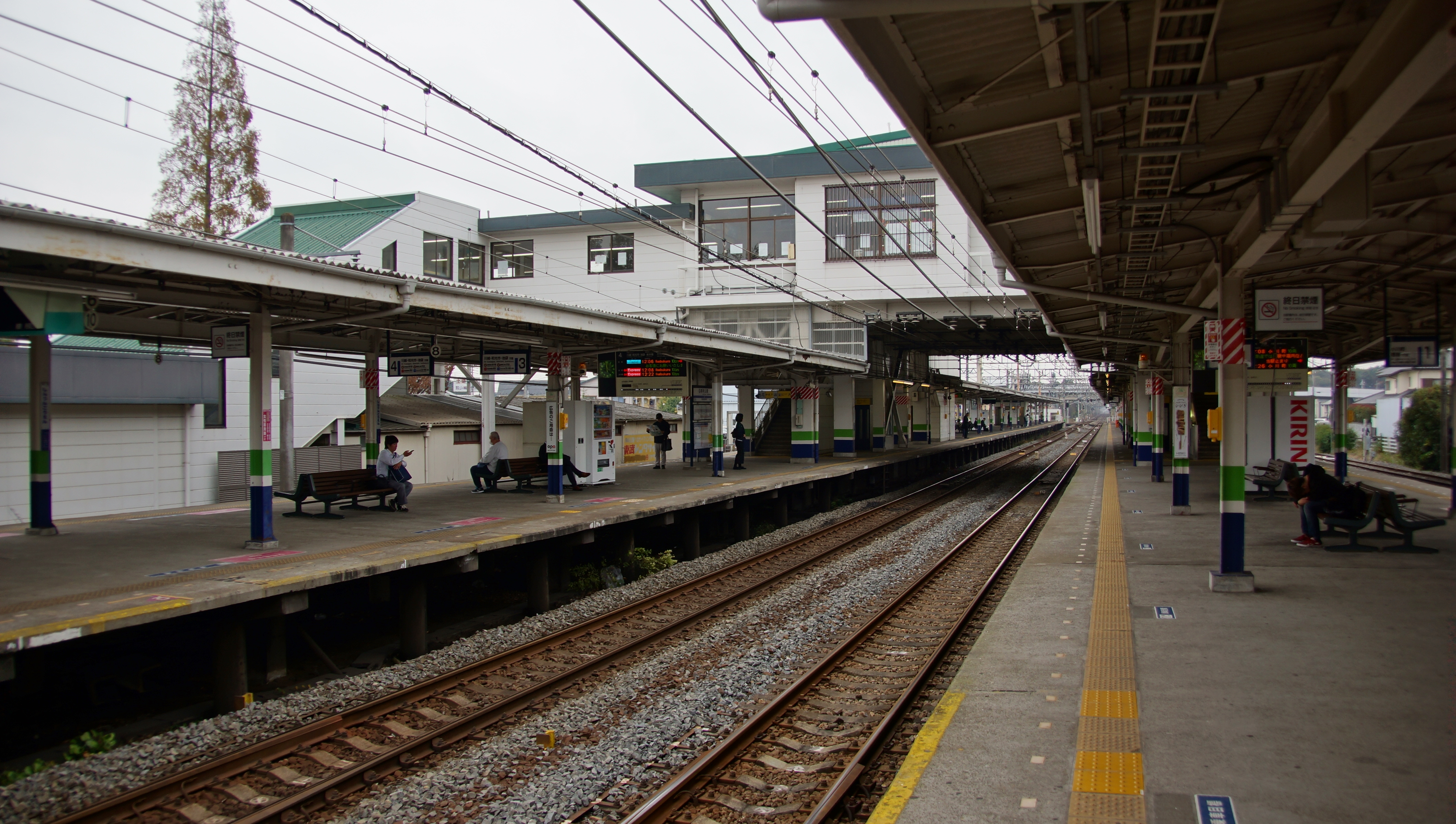
The view from the down end of platform 1/2 in November 2015

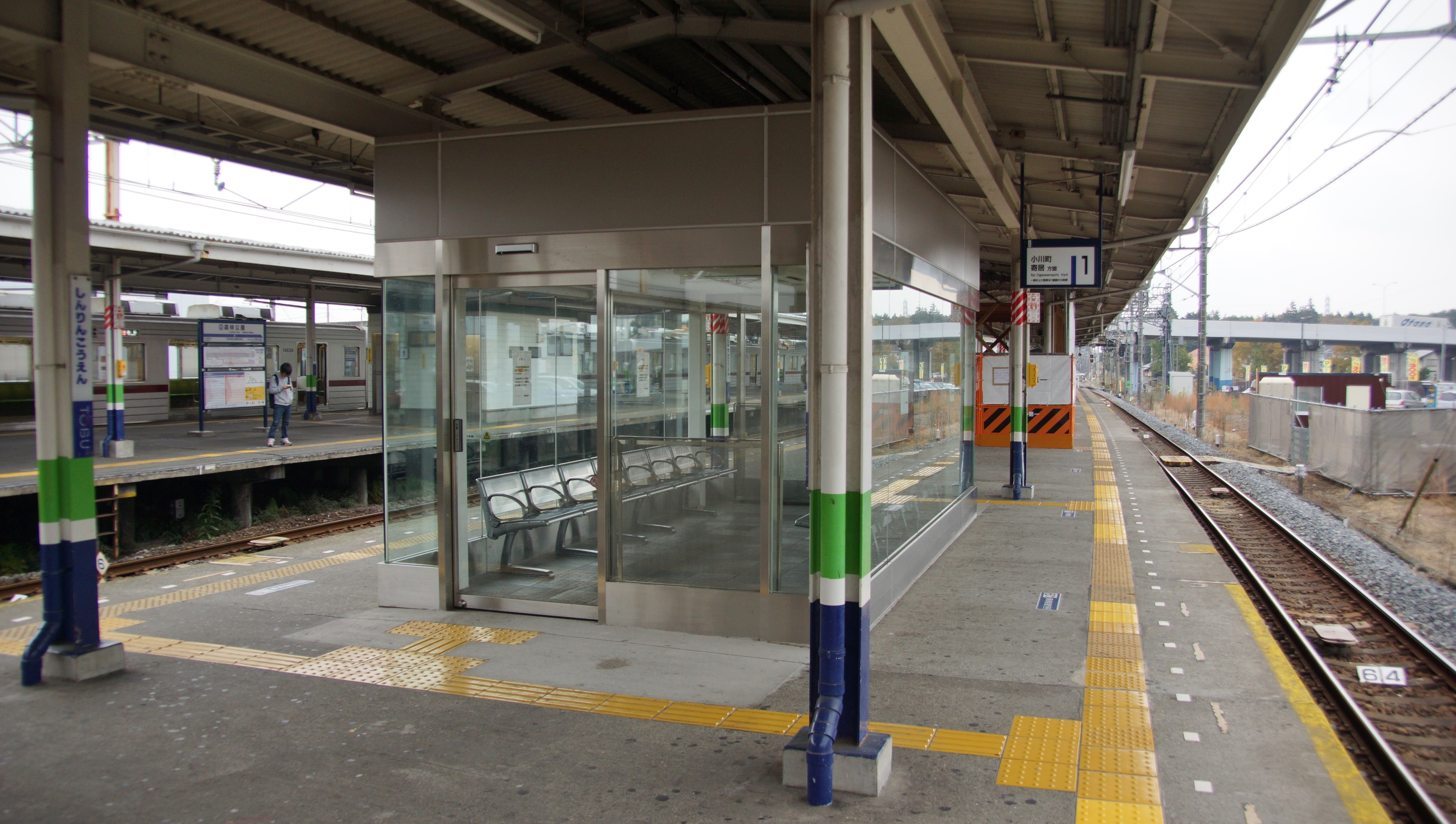
The passenger waiting room on platform 1/2 in November 2015

== History ==
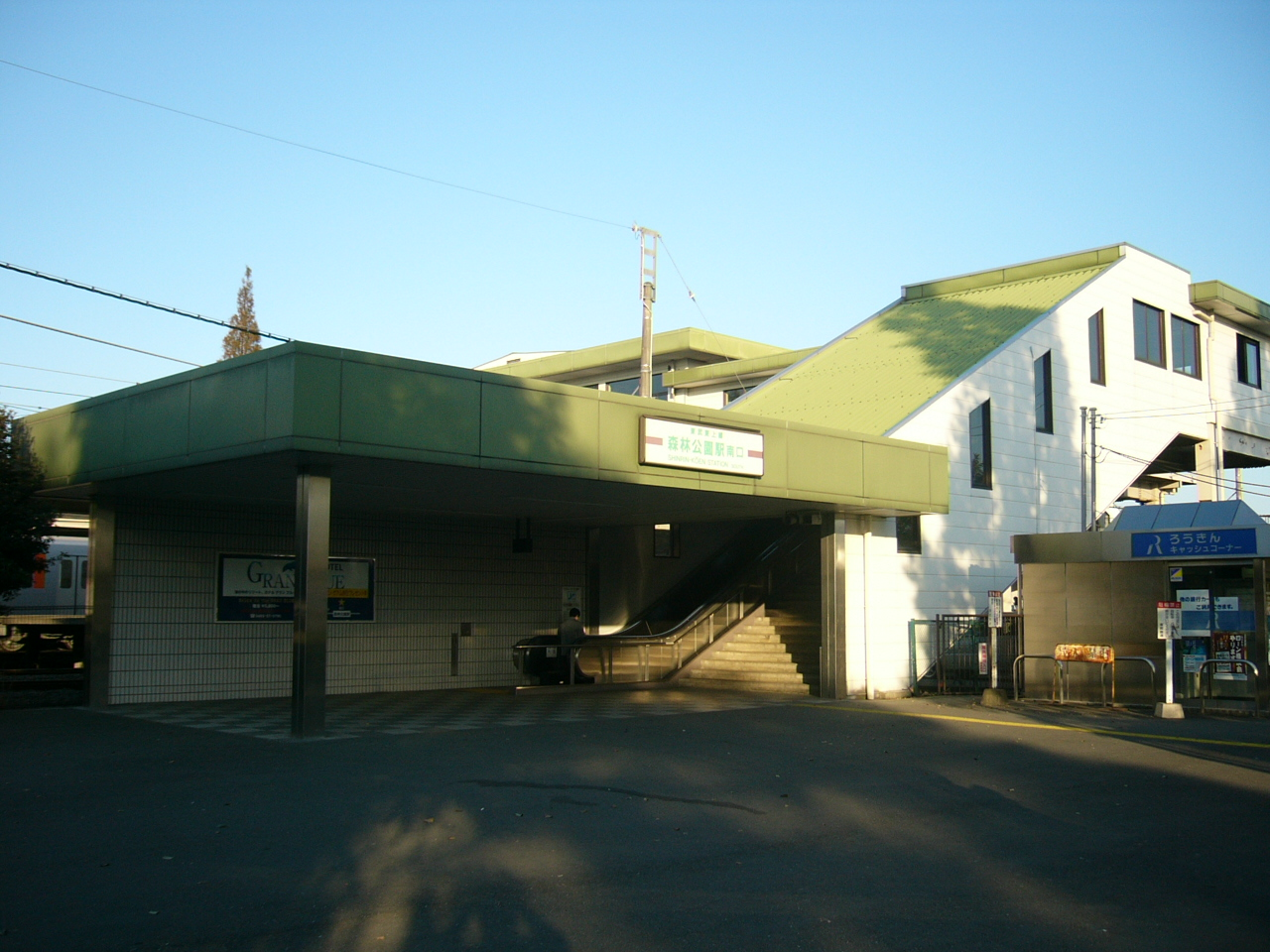
The south entrance in November 2004

The station opened on 1 March 1971.

From 17 March 2012, station numbering was introduced on the Tōbu Tōjō Line, with Shinrin-kōen Station becoming "TJ-30".

Through running to and from Shin-Yokohama and Shōnandai via the Tōkyū Shin-yokohama Line, Sōtetsu Shin-yokohama Line, Sōtetsu Main Line, and Sōtetsu Izumino Line commenced on 18 March 2023.

== Passenger statistics ==
In fiscal 2019, the station was used by an average of 14,284 passengers daily.

== Surrounding area ==
- Musashi Kyūryō National Government Park
- Tobu Shinrin-koen Depot
- National Route 254
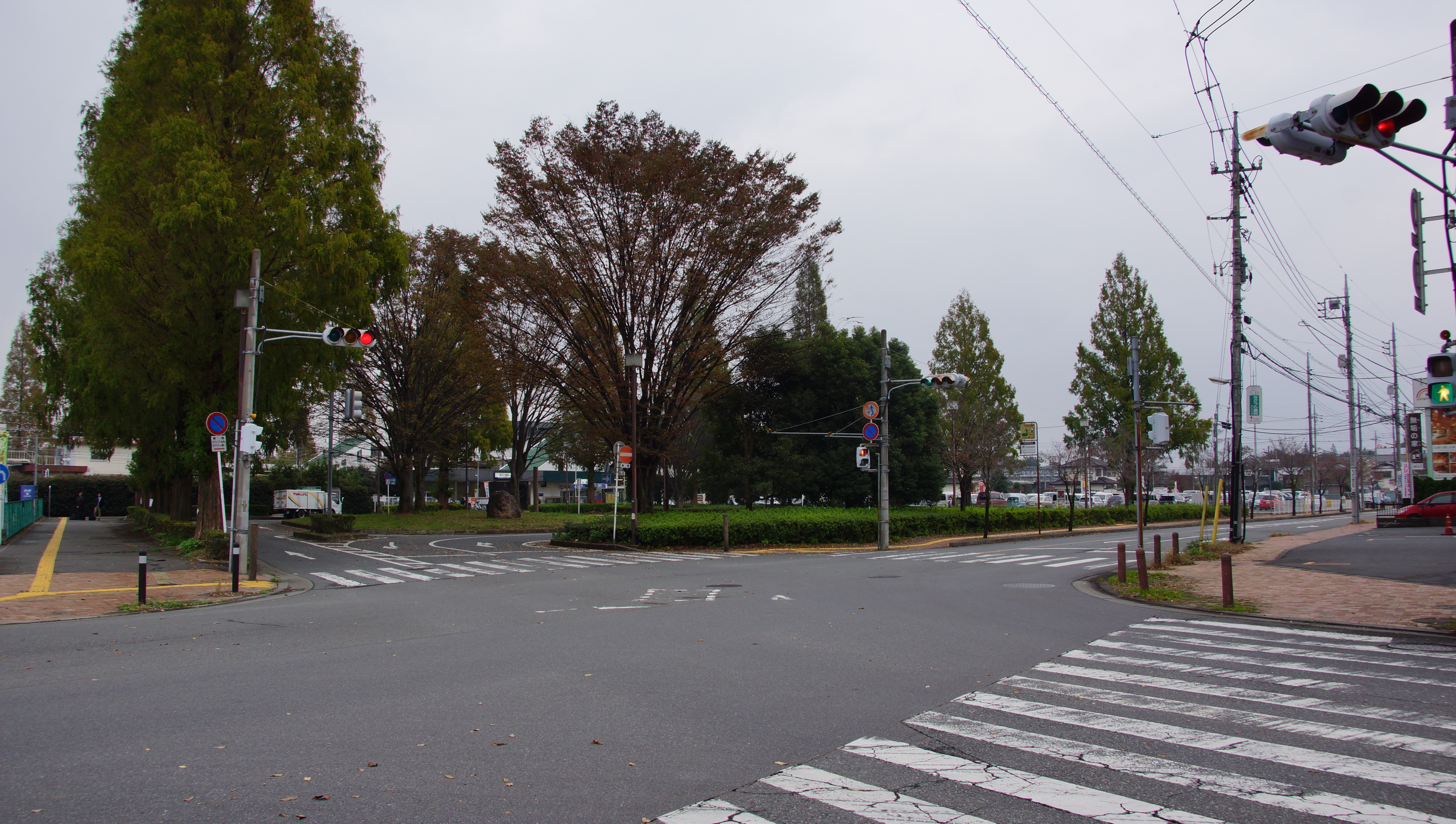
The main road on the south side of the station, November 2015

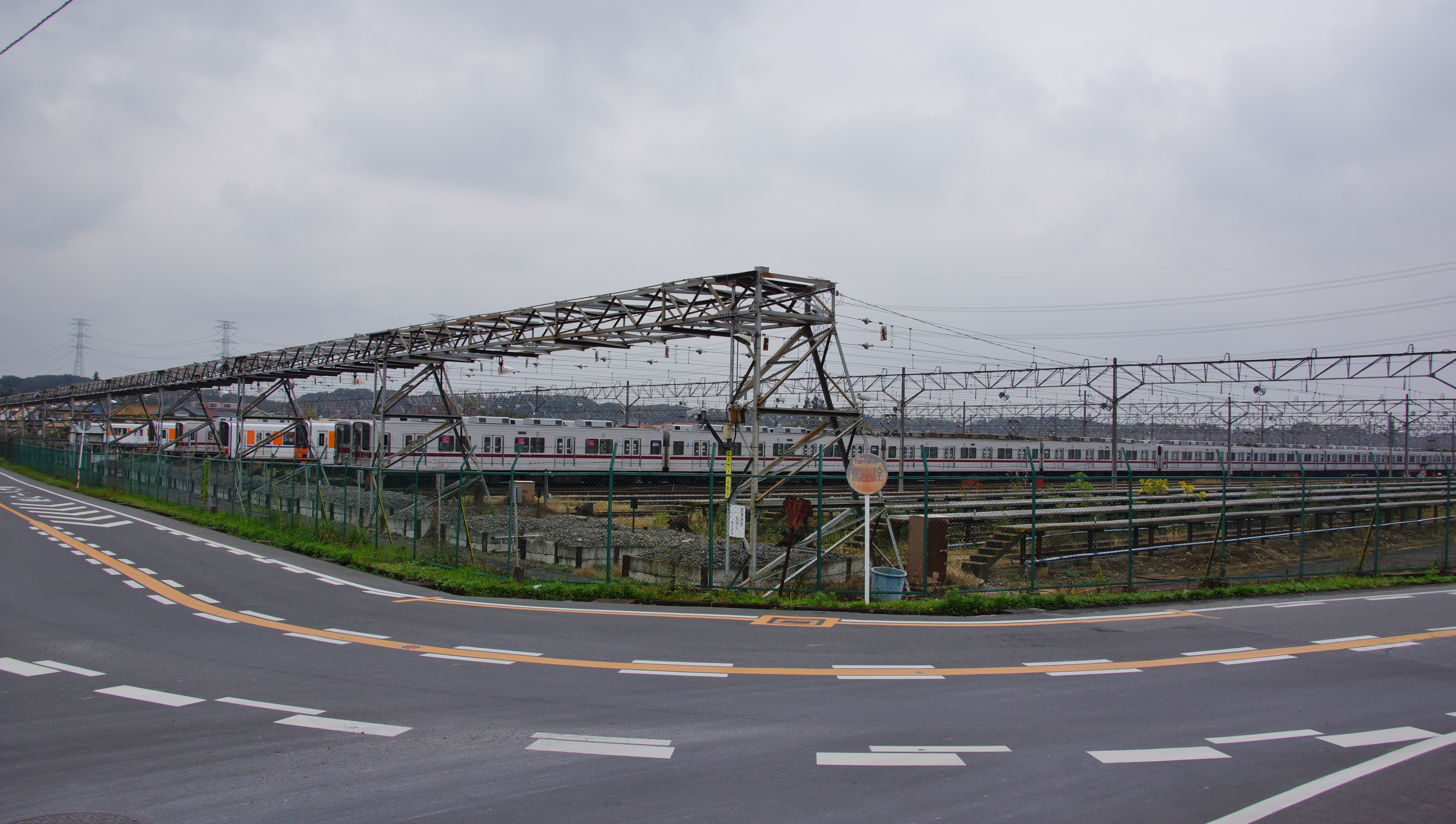
Shinrin-koen Depot, November 2015

== Bus services ==
Express bus services to and from Haneda Airport are operated jointly by Kokusai Juo and Airport Transport Service (Limousine Bus).

== See also ==
- List of railway stations in Japan
- Shinrin-Kōen Station (Hokkaido), JR Hokkaido station with similar name
