= Takino Suzuran Hillside National Government Park =

National government park in Sapporo, Hokkaido, Japan

Coordinates: 42.916787°N 141.388785°E

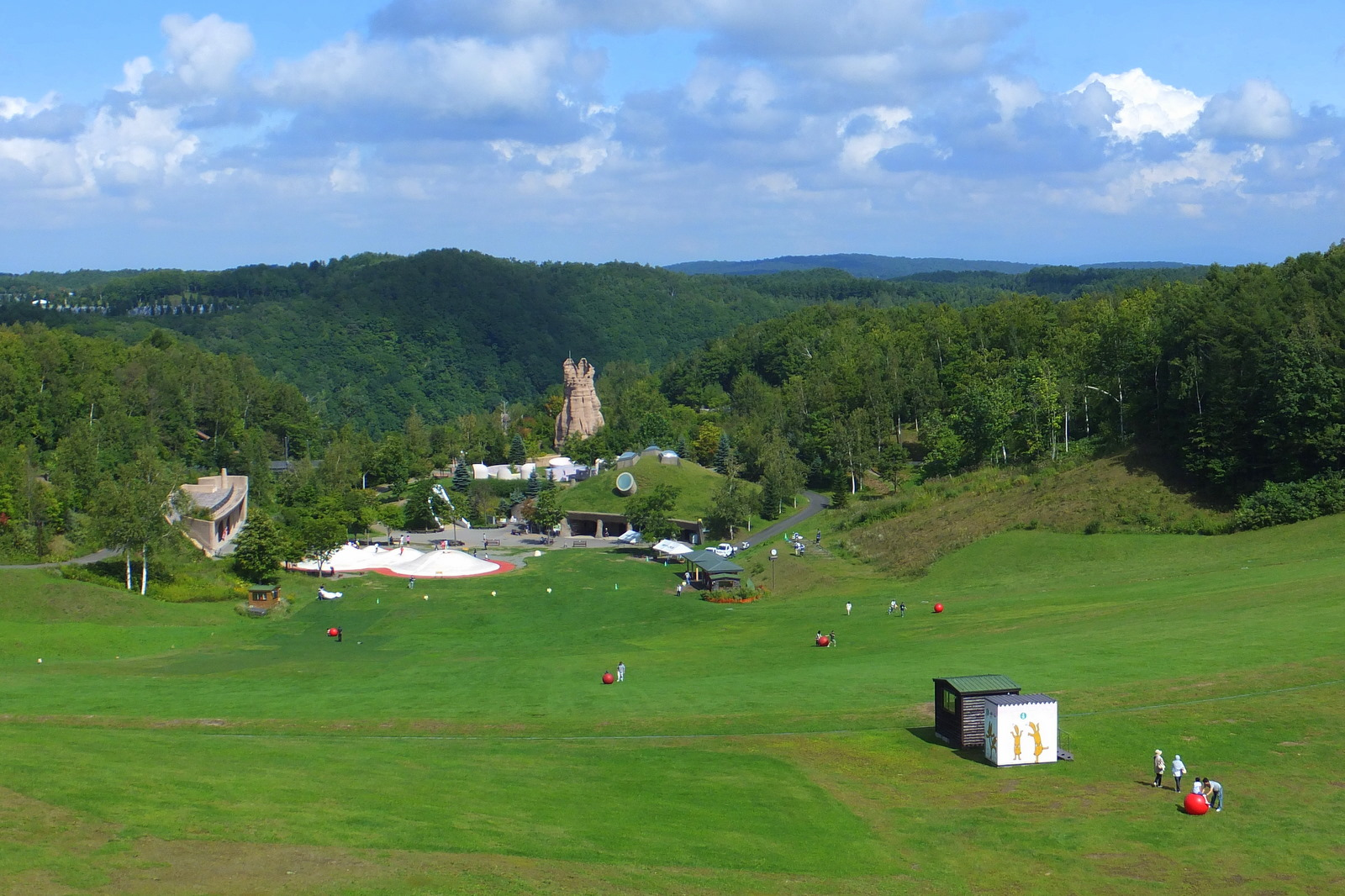

Takino Suzuran Hillside National Government Park (国営滝野すずらん丘陵公園, Kokuei Takino Suzuran Kyūryō Kōen) is a Japanese national government park located in Sapporo, Hokkaido. It is the only national government park in the northern island of Hokkaido. The park area spreads over 395.7m hectares of hilly country and ranges in altitude between 160 and 320 m above sea level. Currently, 192.3m is accessible to the public. The park grounds are separated into six zones: the Mountain Stream Zone, Central Zone, Lodging Zone, Forest Experience Zone (planned to be open in 2009), Nature Observation Zone (planned to be open in 2010), and Preservation Zone (not open to the public). During the winter season, the park operates as the “Takino Snow World”, providing visitors with a wide variety of winter outdoor activities.

== History ==
In 1975, the Hokkaido Regional Development Bureau set up a committee to select a possible location for a national government park in Hokkaido. In 1976, the committee chose the current site, and the construction of the park was officially decided in 1977. In 1983, the park, with approximately 30 hectares of the planned 395.7 hectare area opened to the public, begins its operation as the fifth national government.

== Access ==
=== By train ===
From Sapporo, take the Sapporo Municipal Subway Nanboku Line to Makomanai Station and transfer to the Chuō Bus Takino Line; get off either at Suzuran Kōen Higashi-guchi Stop or Atsubetsu no Taki Stop.

=== car ===
Drive on the Central Hokkaido Expressway and exist at the Sapporo South Interchange; head for Makomanai/Takino and follow the road signs.
