= Musashi Kyūryō National Government Park =

National government park in Japan

- 国営武蔵丘陵森林公園; Kokuei Musashi Kyūryō Shinrin Kōen
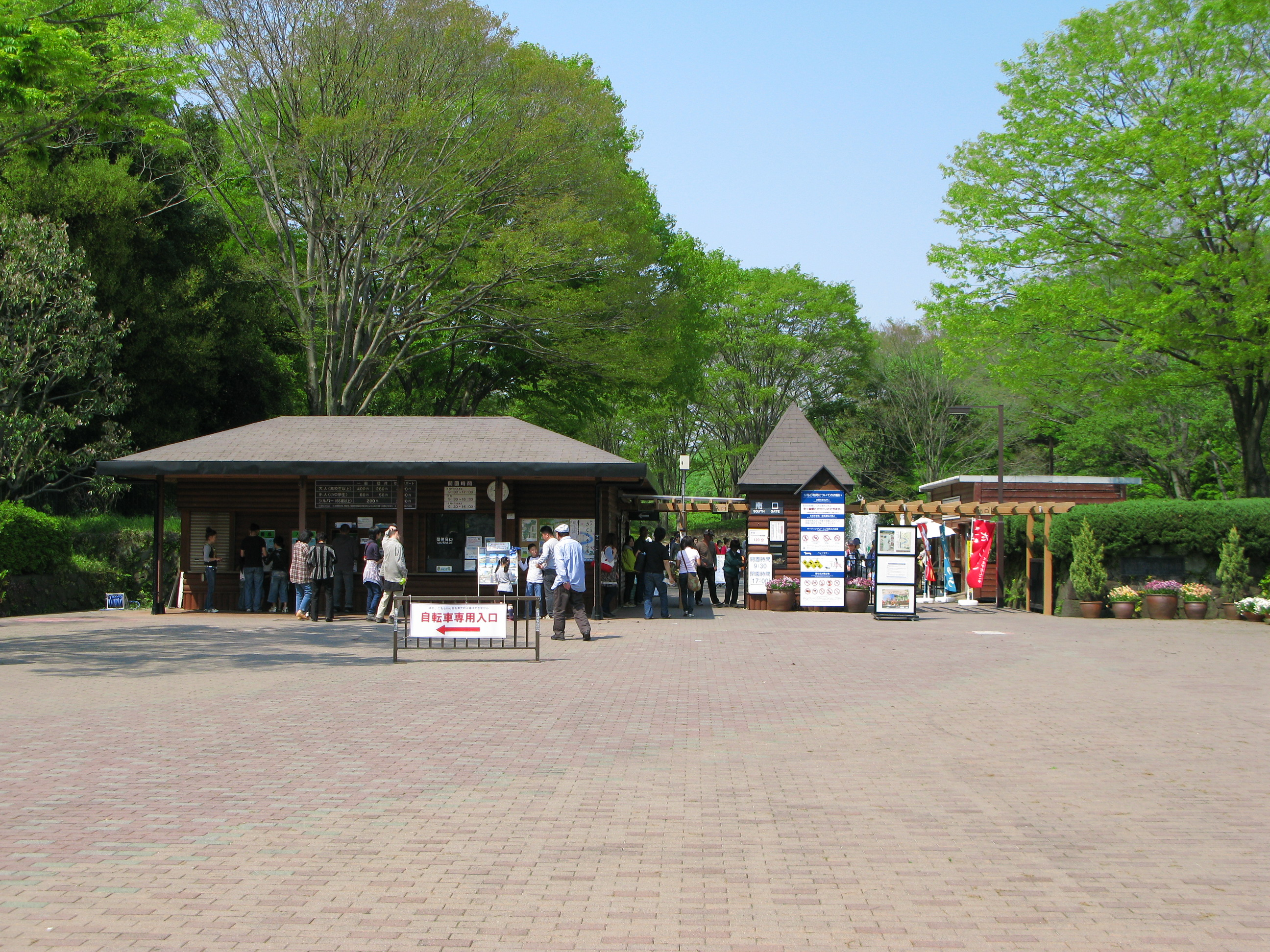
- South gate

- Location within Japan
- Location: Namegawa, Saitama Prefecture, Japan
- Coordinates: 36°05′11″N 139°22′12″E
- Established: 1974
- Website: www.shinrinkoen.jp

Musashi Kyūryō National Government Park (国営武蔵丘陵森林公園, Kokuei Musashi Kyūryō Shinrin Kōen) is a national government park located on the Hiki Hills (比企丘陵, Hiki Kyūryō) of the town of Namegawa, Saitama Prefecture, Japan. It is also known as a National forest park. In 1974, it opened as the first National Government Park. The park covers a vast area of forest and offers opportunities for various outdoor activities. The park has four entrances: the Central, North, West, and South Entrances. It takes roughly 80 minutes to walk the 5 kilometres (3.1 mi) from the South Entrance to the North Entrance and 30 minutes from the West to the Central Entrance, a distance of 1.7 kilometres (1.1 mi).

== Features ==
The park provides a variety of opportunities for outdoor activities and takes days to fully explore the entire park grounds. The park features bike trails, walking paths, flower and herb gardens, athletic grounds, nature walks, a cross-country running course, a marathon course, an orienteering course, a disk golf course, off-leash areas for dogs and ropes courses for children. Picnic grounds and restaurants are also available. With reservations, a variety of educational activities for outdoors are also offered by volunteering staff.
