= Ogawamachi Station (Saitama) =

Railway station in Ogawa, Saitama Prefecture, Japan

TJ33 Ogawamachi Station 小川町駅
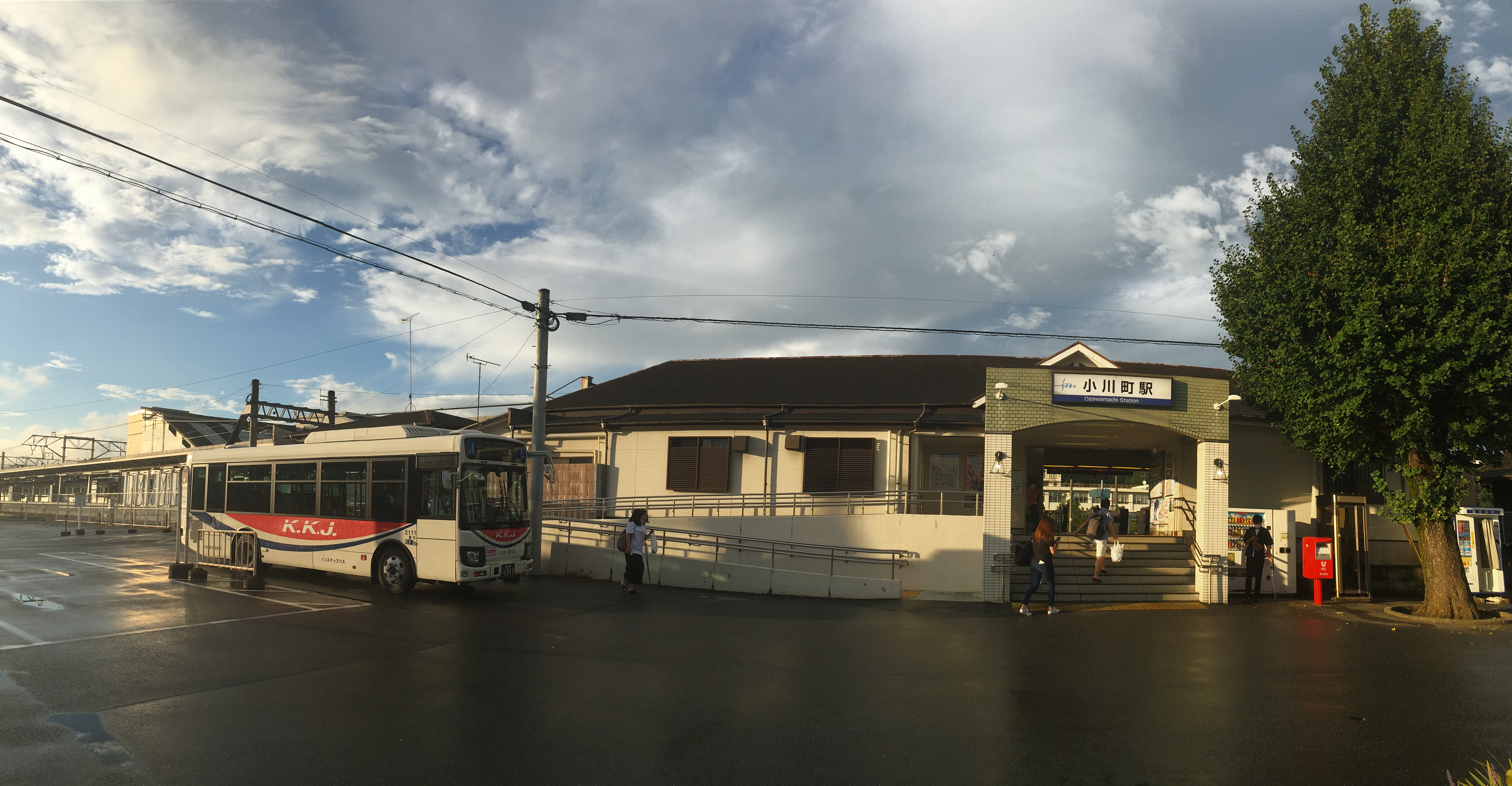
- The station entrance in September 2020

General information
- Location: Ōtsuka, Ogawa-machi, Hiki-gun, Saitama-ken 355-0328; Japan
- Coordinates: 36.058892°N 139.260807°E
- Operator: Tōbu Railway (manager); JR East
- Lines: ■ Hachikō Line; Tōbu Tōjō Line
- Distance: 52.8 km from Hachiōji
- Platforms: 6 (3 island platforms)
- Tracks: 8

Construction
- Structure type: At-grade
- Accessible: Yes

Other information
- Station code: TJ-33 (Tobu)
- Website: Official website (Tobu)

History
- Opened: 5 November 1923

Passengers
- FY2019: 9449 daily(Tobu); 599 daily (JR East)

Services
| Preceding station | JR East | Following station |
|---|---|---|
| Takezawa towards Takasaki | Hachikō Line | Myōkaku towards Komagawa |
| Preceding station | Tobu Railway | Following station |
| Terminus | TJ Liner | Musashi-Ranzan TJ32 towards Ikebukuro |
| Terminus | Kawagoe | Musashi-Ranzan TJ32 towards Ikebukuro |
| Terminus | F Liner | Musashi-Ranzan TJ32 towards Motomachi-Chūkagai |
| Terminus | Tojo Line Rapid Express Express Semi Express Local | Musashi-Ranzan TJ32 towards Ikebukuro |
| Tōbu-Takezawa TJ34 towards Yorii | Tojo Line | Terminus |
Location
- Location within Saitama Prefecture Location within Japan

Ogawamachi Station (小川町駅, Ogawamachi-eki) is a joint-use railway station located in the town of Ogawa, Saitama, Japan, operated jointly by the East Japan Railway Company (JR East) and the private Tōbu Railway Company. The station premises are managed by Tobu Railway.

== Lines ==
Ogawamachi Station is served by the Hachikō Line between Komagawa and Takasaki, and also by the Tōbu Tōjō Line from Ikebukuro in Tokyo. It is located 64.1 km (39.8 mi) from the Tōbu Tōjō Line Ikebukuro terminus. All services, (TJ Liner, Kawagoe Limited Express, Rapid Express, Rapid, Express, Semi Express, Local) stop at this station. During the daytime, the station is served by two Local trains per hour operating between Yorii and Shinrin-kōen. During weekends and holidays, three trains, including two F Liner trains, run via the Tokyo Metro Fukutoshin Line, Tōkyū Tōyoko Line, and Minatomirai Line to Motomachi-Chūkagai.

== Station layout ==
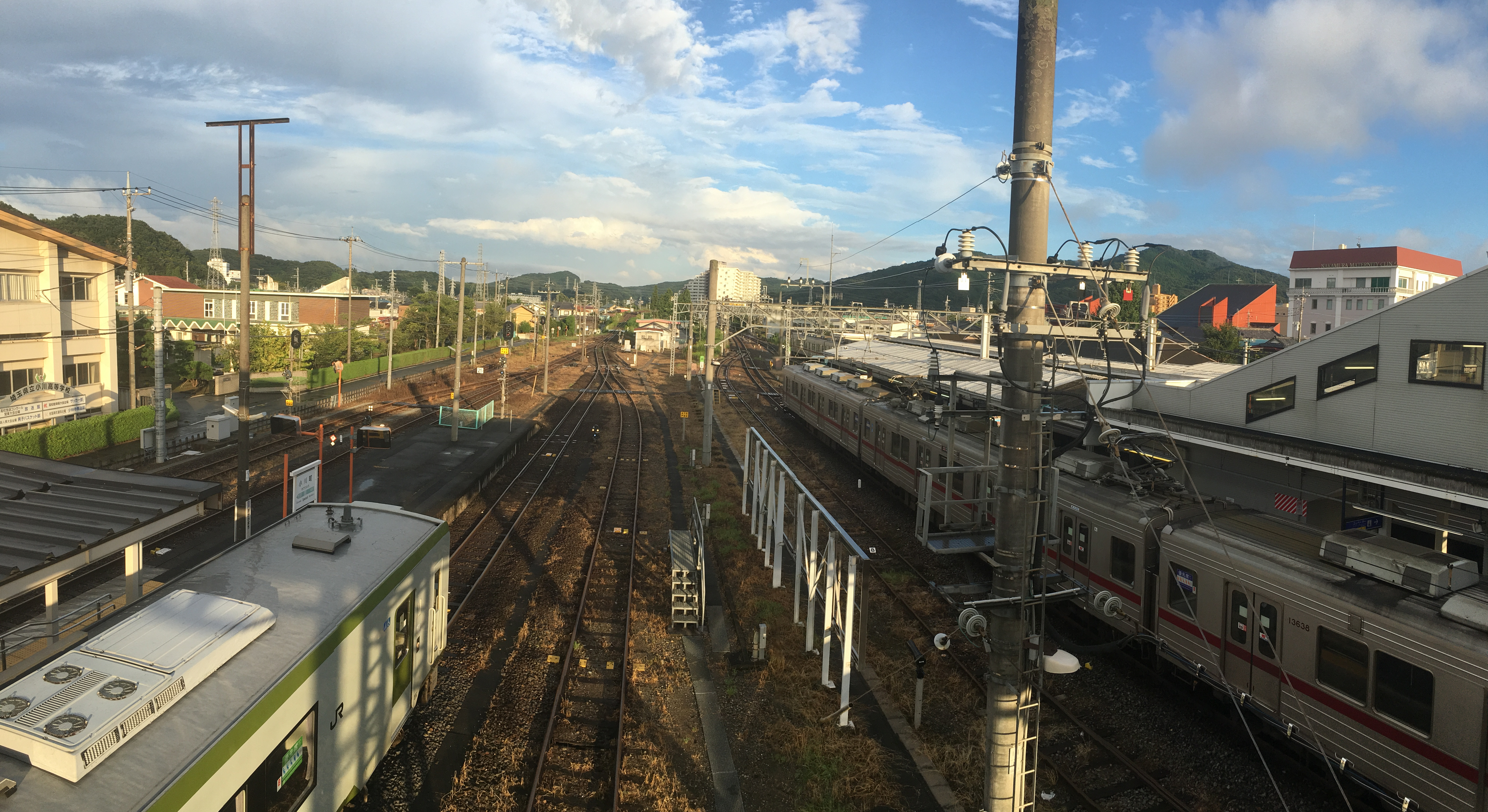
View of the station showing Tōbu platforms on right and JR East platforms on left, September 2020

The Tōbu side of the station consists of two island platforms serving four tracks. The JR East side of the station consists of one island platform serving two tracks, forming a passing loop on the single-track Hachikō Line. Two storage tracks lie between the Tobu and JR East platforms.

The Tobu station has a season ticket sales office.

=== Platforms ===
| 1 | Tōbu Tōjō Line | for Yorii |
| 2 | Tōbu Tōjō Line | for Shinrin-kōen, Kawagoe, and Ikebukuro; Tokyo Metro Fukutoshin Line for Shibuya; Tōkyū Tōyoko Line for Yokohama; Minatomirai Line for Motomachi-Chukagai |
| 3 | Tōbu Tōjō Line | for Yorii |
| 4 | Tōbu Tōjō Line | for Shinrin-kōen, Kawagoe, and Ikebukuro; Tokyo Metro Fukutoshin Line for Shibuya; Tōkyū Tōyoko Line for Yokohama; Minatomirai Line for Motomachi-Chukagai |
| 7 | ■ Hachikō Line | for Yorii and Takasaki |
| 8 | ■ Hachikō Line | for Ogose and Komagawa |

== History ==
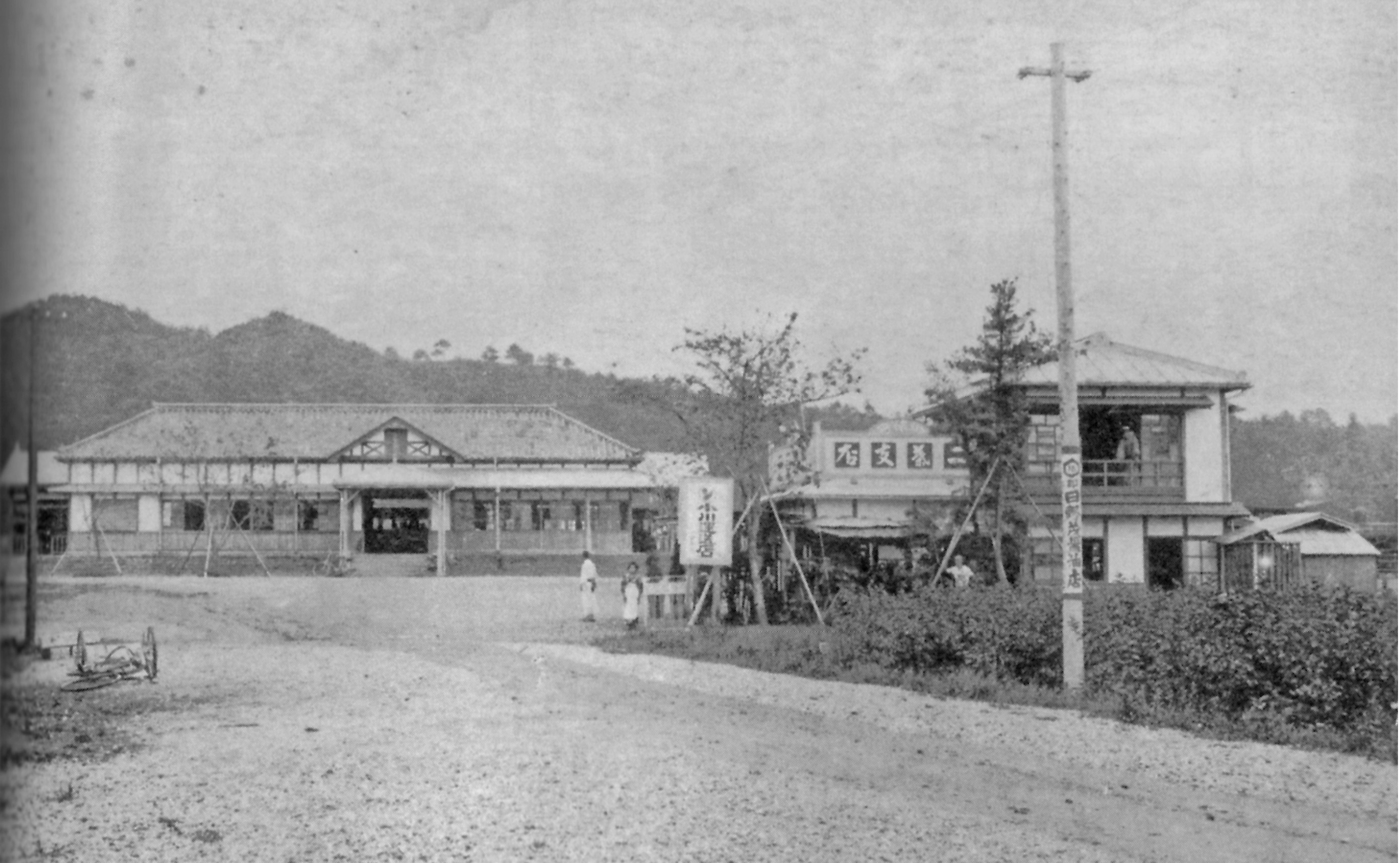
Ogawamachi Station shortly after opening in 1923

The Tōbu station opened on 5 November 1923, while what is now the JR station opened on 24 March 1934.

From 17 March 2012, station numbering was introduced on the Tōbu Tōjō Line, with Ogawamachi Station becoming "TJ-33".

== Passenger statistics ==
In fiscal 2019, the Tobu station was used by an average of 9,449 passengers daily. In fiscal 2019, the JR station was used by an average of 599 passengers daily (boarding passengers only).

| Fiscal year | Daily average |
|---|---|
| 2000 | 638 |
| 2005 | 616 |
| 2010 | 661 |
| 2015 | 644 |

== Surrounding area ==
- Ogawamachi Town Hall
- Ogawamachi Post Office
- Saitama Prefectural Ogawa High School
- National Route 254

== See also ==
- List of railway stations in Japan
