= Ogura Castle =

- 小倉城
- Ranzan, Saitama Prefecture, Japan

Site information
- Type: Japanese castle
- Open to the public: yes
- Condition: ruins

Location
- Coordinates: 36°01′57.7″N 139°17′49.0″E

Site history
- In use: Sengoku period

Ogura Castle (小倉城, Ogura-jō) was a Sengoku period Japanese castle located in what is now part of the town of Ranzan, Hiki District, Saitama, in the Kantō region of Japan. The site has been protected by the central government as a National Historic Site, since 2008.

== Overview ==
Ogura Castle is located on a 70-meter high ridge overlooking a U-shaped bend in the Tsuchigawa River in the western part of Hiki District of Saitama Prefecture. The Tsuchigawa River flows from eastern edge of the Chichibu Mountains, forming the border between the towns of Ogawa and Ranzan. The valley below Ogura Castle, is called Ranzan Valley and the scenery has been compared with Arashiyama in Kyoto for its autumn leaves.

The castle covers an area of 600 by 200 meters and extends from the southwest to northeast. As the eastern slope is rather gentle and had a flat space before the river suitable for a castle town, the castle faces east. It consists of two large enclosures. The main enclosure is trapezoidal and measures 80 by 40 meters, and is divided into upper and lower areas. There were gates at the north, south and each directions, each with stone walls. South of the main enclosure was a dry moat and the secondary enclosure with dimensions of 80 by 30 meters. This enclosure was also protected by a high clay rampart and another dry moat. East of the main enclosure is a small trapezoidal third bailey, with stone walls that are three meters high. Aside from these core areas, the castle had many terraces on the slopes of the ridge and dry moats to obstruct the advance of any enemy. The castle makes more use of stone walls in its fortifications than was normal for the time; however, the stones were small, flat pieces and were stacked like bricks. This type of construction is unique in the Kantō region.

== History ==
As with many neighboring castles in the area, as Sugiyama Castle or Sugaya Yakata, the origins of Ogura Castle are uncertain. By tradition, it was built by the Ueda clan, who were retainers of the Uesugi clan with a base at Musashi-Matsuyama Castle, 10 kilometers to the east. However, another tradition states that it was built by the Toyama clan, who were also retainers of the Hōjō clan. The Ueda were descendants of one the seven main bands of samurai in Musashi Province and were important retainers to the Ogigayatsu Uesugi clan in the latter half of 15th century. In the early 16th century the Ueda were allied with Ota Sukemasa, lord of Iwatsuki Castle against the Hōjō clan. The Ueda later switched fealty to the Hōjō and as a result were attacked and defeated by Uesugi Kenshin, who seized Musashi-Matsuyama Castle in 1560. The Hōjō assisted the Ueda in recovering their territory in 1563; however, Musashi-Matsuyama Castle was at the eastern edge of their territory, and Ogura Castle was more centrally located.

The Ueda clan disappears from history at the time of the destruction of the Hōjō clan in 1590 at the hands of Toyotomi Hideyoshi, and Ogura Castle was abandoned and fell into ruin around that time.

In 2008, the site received protection as one of the four "Hiki Fortified Residence Sites" in Saitama, including the Sugaya Yakata, Musashi-Matsuyama Castle, and Sugiyama Castle.

The castle site is about a 60 minute walk from Musashi-Ranzan Station on the Tōbu Tōjō Line.

== See also ==
- List of Historic Sites of Japan (Saitama)
