= Matsuyama Castle (Ranzan) =

Castle in Saitama Prefecture, Japan

- 松山城
- Yoshimi, Saitama Prefecture, Japan
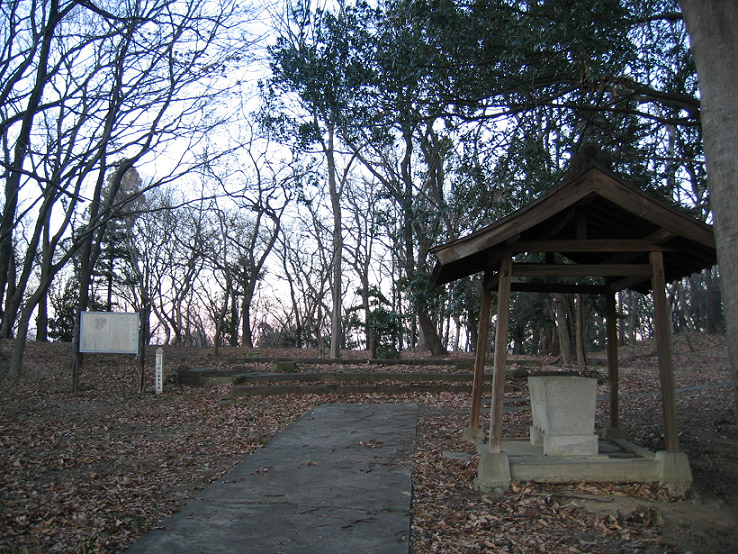
- Location of Main Bailey of Musashi Matsuyama Castle

Site information
- Type: Japanese castle
- Open to the public: yes
- Condition: ruins

Location
- Location within Saitama Prefecture Location within Japan
- Coordinates: 36°2′15″N 139°25′14″E

Site history
- Built: 1399?
- In use: Sengoku period
- Demolished: 1601

Matsuyama Castle (松山城, Matsuyama-jō) was a Sengoku period Japanese castle located in what is now part of the town of Yoshimi, Hiki District, Saitama, in the Kantō region of Japan. Its ruins have been protected as a National Historic Site, since 2008. It is also referred to as Musashi-Matsuyama Castle, to distinguish it from the more famous Bitchū Matsuyama Castle or Iyo Matsuyama Castle.

== Overview ==
Matsuyama Castle is located on the western bank of the Arakawa River in the center of Saitama, where the river changes direction from the east to the south. On a hill protected on two sides by the river, this location had natural fortifications and was part of a defensive line (along with Hachigata Castle, Kawagoe Castle and Edo Castle) created by Ōta Dōkan to protect Kamakura from enemies to the north and east. The exact date the castle was founded is uncertain, but it is believed to be in the latter half of the 15th century. The Uesugi clan was in constant struggle against the growing power of the Later Hōjō clan, who seized Kawagoe in 1537. Uesugi Tomosada escaped from Kawagoe to Musashi-Matsuyama. He ordered that the defenses of the castle be greatly expanded, with a large number of dry moats constructed. He continued to resist the Hōjō for ten more years, but was defeated and killed in 1546 by Hōjō Ujiyasu.

After the fall of the Ogigayatsu Uesugi clan, Matsuyama Castle came under the control of the Hōjō and was a major redoubt in their incessant struggles against Uesugi Kenshin. Kenshin managed to seize Matsuyama Castle and went on to lay siege to the Hōjō stronghold at Odawara Castle, but was unable to maintain momentum and eventually withdrew to Echigo Province in 1560. The Hōjō counterattacked as part of an alliance with Takeda Shingen, but as the defenders of the castle were well-prepared, they could not easily retake it. Shingen brought in sappers from Kai Province in an attempt to undermine the defenses but his also failed. After three months, Hōjō Ujiyasu tricked the garrison by telling them at they were completely cut off from rescue, as snows has closed the passes to Echigo, and Kenshin's army was forced into winter camp. Believing this, the garrison surrendered; however, Kenshin was in fact only days away. On hearing if the surrender, Kenshin issued a challenge to combat, but as the Hōjō and Takeda had achieved their objective and were now entrenched in Matsuyama, the challenge was unanswered.

Afterwards, the castle was maintained by the Hōjō clan. It was retaken by Kenshin once, but recaptured by the Hōjō once again. At the time of the Odawara Campaign, Toyotomi Hideyoshi sent an army of 40,000 men led by Maeda Toshiie and Uesugi Kagekatsu against Musashi-Matsuyama, and its 2300 defenders surrendered without resistance. The castle was used until 1601, when it was abandoned.

At present, the outlines of the enclosures and moats remain in good shape. In 2008, the site received protection as one of the four "Hiki Fortification ruins" in Saitama, including the Sugaya Yakata, Sugiyama Castle, and Ogura Castle. The castle site is a 15-minute walk from Higashi-Matsuyama Station on the Tōbu Tōjō Line.

== See also ==
- List of Historic Sites of Japan (Saitama)
