= Tamagawa =

Tamagawa (玉川) may refer to:

== Places ==
- Tamagawa, Ehime, a former town in Ehime Prefecture that is now part of the city of Imabari, Japan
- Tamakawa, Fukushima, a village in Fukushima Prefecture, Japan
- Tamagawa, Saitama, a village in Saitama Prefecture, Japan
- Tamagawa, Yamaguchi, a town in Yamaguchi Prefecture, Japan
- Tama River (in Japanese, 多摩川 Tamagawa) in and near Tokyo, Japan
- Tamagawa, Akita, location of Japan's highest flow rate hot spring, the Tamagawa Hot Spring, in Akita Prefecture, Japan

== Other uses ==
- Tamagawa (surname)
- Tamagawa Station (disambiguation)
- Tamagawa Line (disambiguation)
- 13207 Tamagawa, main-belt asteroid
