= Jikō-ji (Tokigawa) =

Buddhist temple in Saitama Prefecture, Japan

- 慈光寺
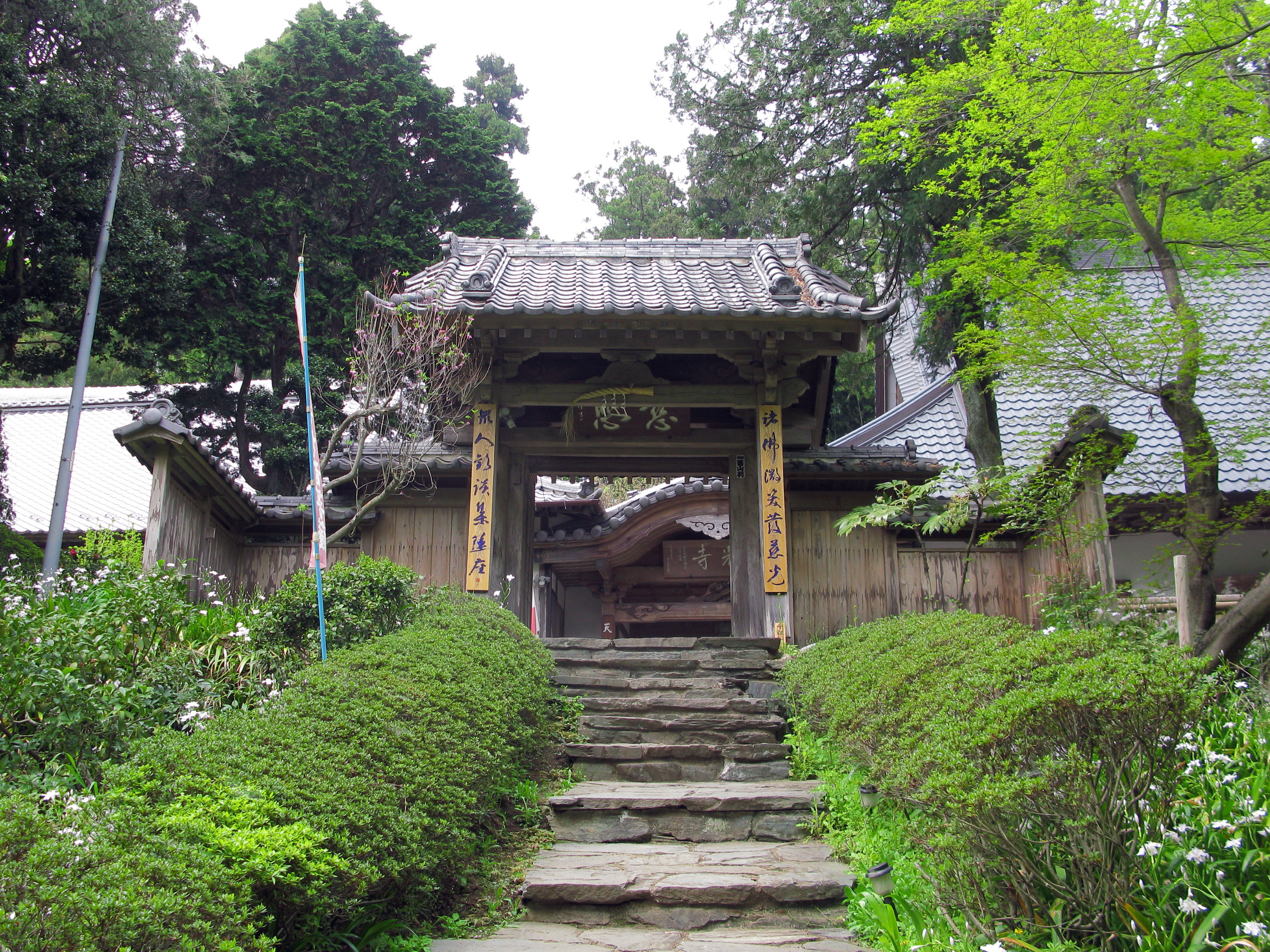
- Jikō-ji Sanmon

- Location within Saitama Prefecture Location within Japan

Religion
- Affiliation: Buddhist
- Deity: Jūichimen Kannon Bosatsu
- Rite: Tendai
- Status: functional

Location
- Location: 386 Nishidaira, Tokigawa-cho, Hiki-gun, Saitama-ken 355-0364
- Country: Japan
- Interactive map of Jikō-ji
- Coordinates: 36°0′41.4″N 139°13′55.6″E

Architecture
- Founder: c.Jikun
- Completed: c.673

Website
- Official website
- National Treasure National Important Cultural Property

Jikō-ji (慈光寺) is a Buddhist temple located in the Nishidaira neighborhood of the town of Tokigawa, Saitama Prefecture, Japan. It belongs to the Tendai sect and its honzon is a statue of Jūichimen Kannon Bosatsu. The temple's full name is Toki-zan Ichijōhōren-in Jikō-ji (都幾山 一乗法華院 慈光寺).The temple is the 9th stop on the Bandō Sanjūsankasho pilgrimage route.

== Overview ==
The exact circumstances surrounding the founding of this temple are uncertain. According to the temple's legend, a chapel housing a statue of the Senjū Kannon was established the monk Jikun of Kofuku-ji in 673.

It became a temple in 770 by the priest Dōchū, a disciple of the high priest Ganjin of Tōshōdai-ji, and in 871 became an imperial temple and joined the Tendai sect at the request of Emperor Seiwa.

During Minamoto no Yoritomo's conquest of the Ōshū-Fujiwara, his general Hatakeyama Shigetada, made the temple the Hatakeyama clan's clan's bodaiji and prayed for successful campaigns. The temple grew briefly to have over 75 hermitages. However, during the Muromachi period, the temple went into decline and was sacked by the rulers of Matsuyama Castle.

It was revived under to Tokugawa shogunate and remains an important temple in the area today.

== Images of the temple ==
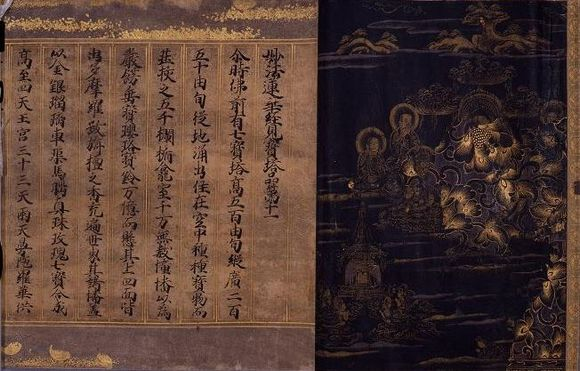
Lotus Sutra (National Treasure)

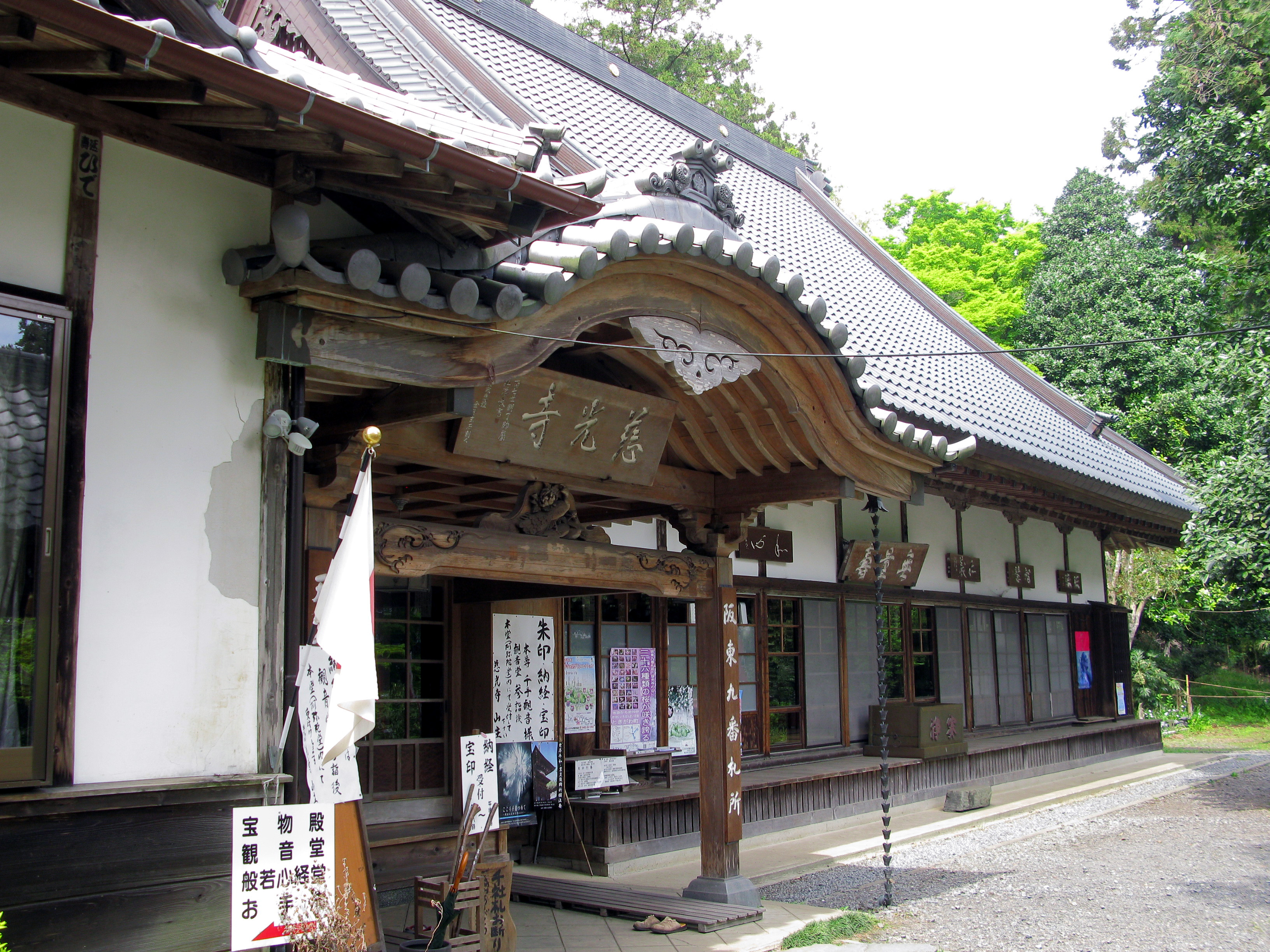
Hondō (Amida-dō)

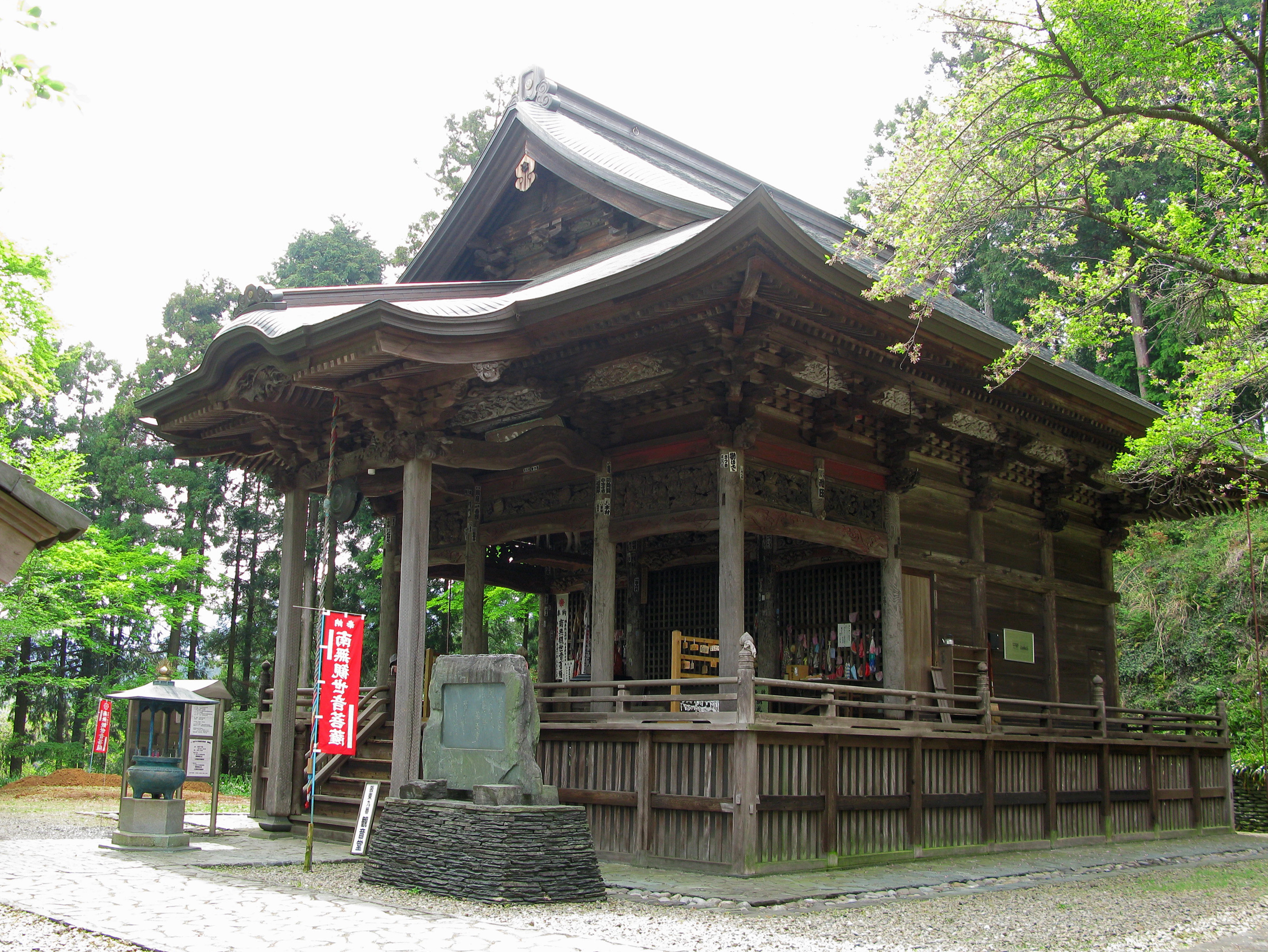
Kannon-dō

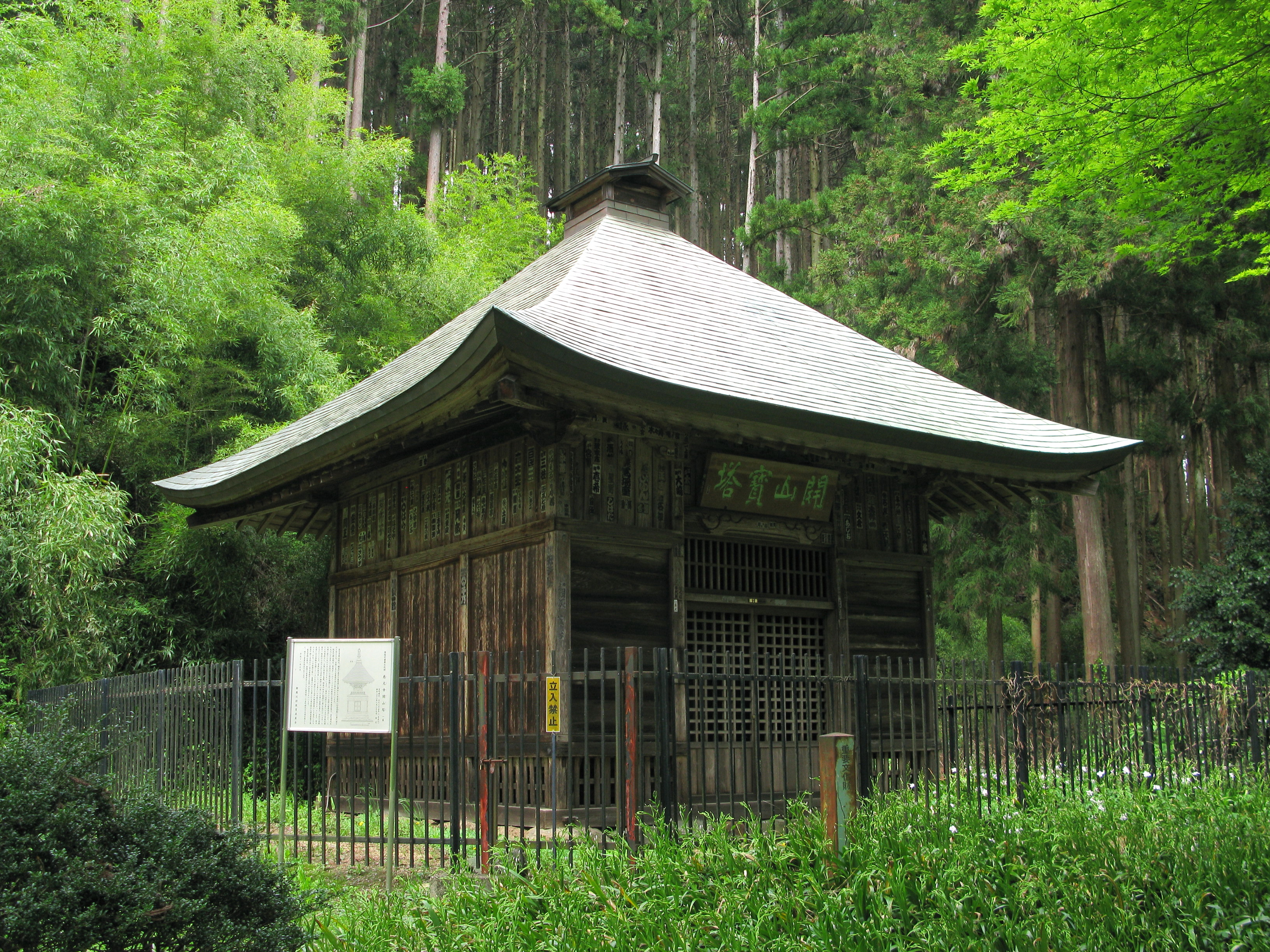
Kaisan-dō

== Bandō Sanjūsankasho (Bandō 33 temple pilgrimage) ==
The temple is the 9th temple on the 33 temple Bandō Sanjūsankasho pilgrimage route.

== Access ==
The closest stations to the temple are Myokaku Station on the JR Hachiko line, and Ogose station on the JR Hachiko and Tobu Ogose lines. The temple is some distance from these stations, and while there are bus services, they do not show up on google or apple map searches.

== Cultural Properties ==
=== National Treasure ===
- Lotus Sutra (法華経一品経), Kamakura period. This is a decorative sutra that was copied at the beginning of the Kamakura period, mainly by people related to the kuge Kujō family, with the participation of the retired Emperor Go-Toba, and it is also called the "Jikō-ji Sutra". Currently, there are 29 volumes of the 28 articles of the Lotus Sutra, 1 volume of the Muryōgikyō of the Muryōgi Sutra, 1 volume of the Kanfugenkyō, 1 volume of the Amida Sutra, and 1 volume of the Heart Sutra, for a total of 33 scrolls. It is luxuriously made with gold and silver sand and silver foil, and is considered one of the three great decorative sutras, along with the Heike Nokyo and the Kunōji Sutra.

=== National Important Cultural Properties ===
- Kaisantō (開山塔), late Muromachi period, dated 1556. A hōtō-style wooden pagoda with a total height of 5.1 meters. The existing pagoda is a reconstruction of the original Heian period monument, and excavations carried out during the repair discovered a Sue ware jar from about 1200 years ago, a large Tokoname jar from about 900 years ago, and decorations from the predecessor pagoda. Although it is not possible to see the actual pagoda as it is inside a covered hall, a replica restored to the same size is on display at the Saitama Prefectural Museum of History and Folklore.
- Bronze bell (銅鐘), Kamakura period. This bonshō was dedicated to Jikō-ji in 1245 by Eichō Zenji, a disciple of Eisai, the founder of the Rinzai school of Japanese Zen, and the founder of Ryōzen-in, a sub-temple of Jikō-ji. It is 150 cm tall and weighs 709 kg, and is made by Shigemitsu, whose name appears as the creator of the bonshō at Kenchō-ji Temple in Kamakura.
- Large Prajñāpāramitā Sūtras (大般若経), Heian period, dated 872. This is a set of 132 scrolls, commissioned and transcribed by Abe no Komizumaro. It is currently kept at the Nara National Museum. Although the handwriting varies and appears to have been done by many people, the skill level was generally high. A petition in scroll 102 indicates that Abe no Komizumaro was a minor noble who had an official position in Kōzuke Province. The sutra originally had 600 scrolls, and several of the missing volumes have been identified in scattered locations around Japan.
- Gilt Bronze ritual implements (金銅密教法具), Kamakura period. This is a set of implements (vajras, bells, etc. used in esoteric Buddhist rituals. Although Jikō-ji was a Tendai temple, but it was also a place where various studies such as esoteric Buddhism and Zen Buddhism were actively practiced. The set is dated 1307.

=== Tokigawa Town Tangible Cultural Properties ===
- Wooden seated statue of Monju Bosatsu (木造聖僧文殊坐像), Kamakura period, depicting Monju Bosatsu as a Buddhist priest. It is a seated statue with a height of 94 cm, made of hinoki cypress parquet. An inscription inside gives the date of 1295, in the late Kamakura period, as the year the statue was created, and the name "Kōkei" was the sculptor.
- Wooden seated statue of crowned Amida Nyōrai (木造宝冠阿弥陀如来坐像), Kamakura period. This relatively small seated statue, about 55 centimeters in height, was originally the principal image of Jōdō-in, a subsidiary temple of Jikō-ji, but that temple was abolished in the early 20th century, and it was moved to the main temple. The topknot and crown on the head have disappeared, and only the base of the crown remains. It is known from historical sources that a memorial service was held in the Jōgyō-dō Hall of Jikō-ji in the early Kamakura period, and it is speculated that this statue was created as the principal image.
- Wooden standing statue of Senjũ Kannon (木造千手観音立像), Muromachi period. Enshrined in Kannon-dō, when that structure was dismantled and repaired during restoration work in 1994, an inscription in ink was discovered inside indicating that the statue had been carved by the great Buddha sculptor Hōgen Nagayoshi in 1549.
- Sutra box (経箱).
- Stone pagods (青石塔婆9基), set of nine
- Grave goods and artifacts from Kaisan-tō (蔵骨器 附:慈光寺開山塔出土品一括).

== See also ==
- List of National Treasures of Japan (writings)
