= Anraku-ji (Yoshimi) =

Buddhist temple in Saitama Prefecture, Japan

- 安楽寺
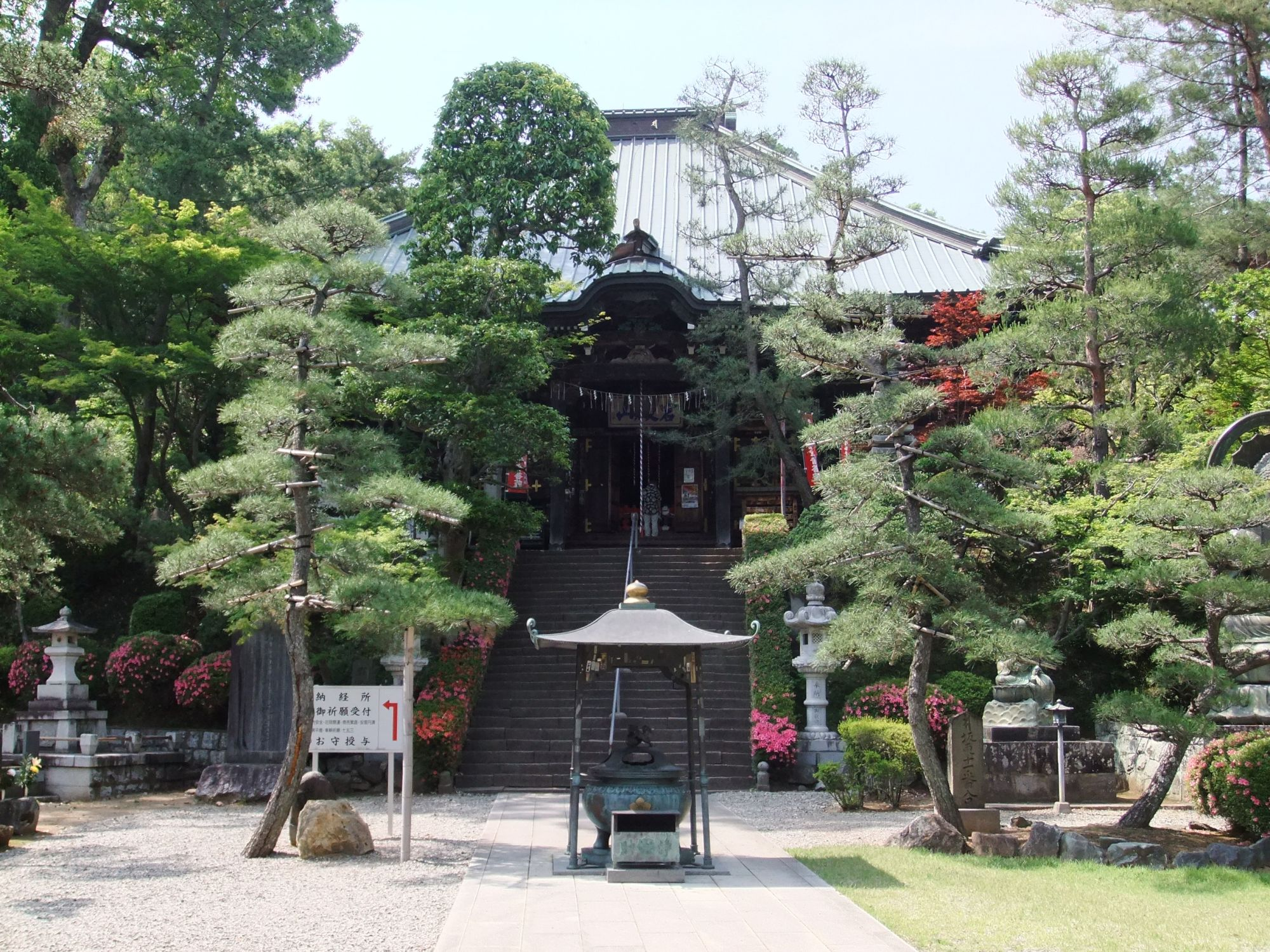
- Anraku-ji Hondo

- Location within Saitama Prefecture Location within Japan

Religion
- Affiliation: Buddhist
- Deity: Senjū Kannon Bosatsu (Sahasrabhūja)
- Rite: Shingon-shū Chisan-ha
- Status: functional

Location
- Location: 374 Gosho, Yoshimi-cho, Hiki-gun, Saitama-ken 355-0151
- Country: Japan
- Interactive map of Anraku-ji
- Coordinates: 36°3′15.6″N 139°26′17.8″E

Architecture
- Founder: c. Gyōki
- Completed: c. 806

Website
- Official website

Anraku-ji (安楽寺) is a Buddhist temple located in the town of Yoshimi, Saitama Prefecture, Japan. It belongs to the Shingon-shū Chisan-ha sect and its honzon is a hibutsu statue of Senjū Kannon Bosatsu (Sahasrabhūja), displayed only on June 18 annually. The temple's full name is Iwadono-zan Kōmyō-in Anraku-ji (岩殿山 光明院 安楽寺).The temple is the 11th stop on the Bandō Sanjūsankasho pilgrimage route. It is also called the "Yoshimi Kannon".

== History ==
Circumstances surrounding the founding of this temple are uncertain. According to the temple's legend, it was founded in 806 by the priest Gyōki, who installed a statue of Kannon Bosatsu into a rock cave.

In the Daidō era (806–810) General Sakanoue no Tamuramaro, while on his way to conquer Ōshū prayed for success in battle at this site, and constructed a temple on his victorious return.

During the Kamakura period, Minamoto no Noriyori (the younger brother of Minamoto no Yoritomo), who had found shelter at the temple as an acolyte after his father was killed in the Heiji rebellion, built a three-story pagoda. This was later destroyed along with the rest of the temple in the Tembun era (1532–1555), during the battle for nearby Matsuyama Castle between Takeda Shingen and Uesugi Kenshin.

The temple was rebuilt again in the Kan'ei era (1624–1644).

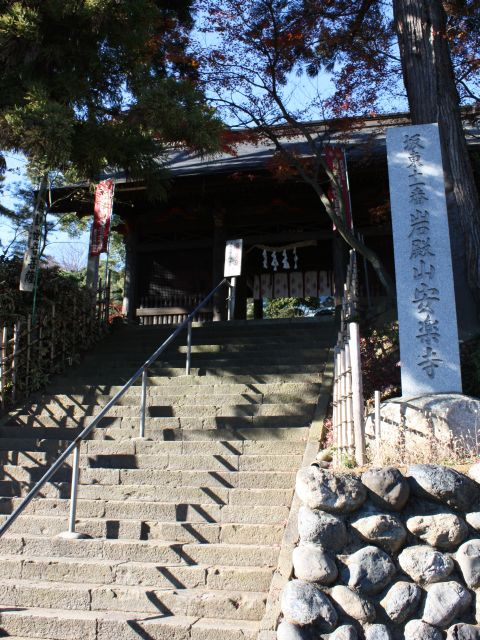
Nio-mon

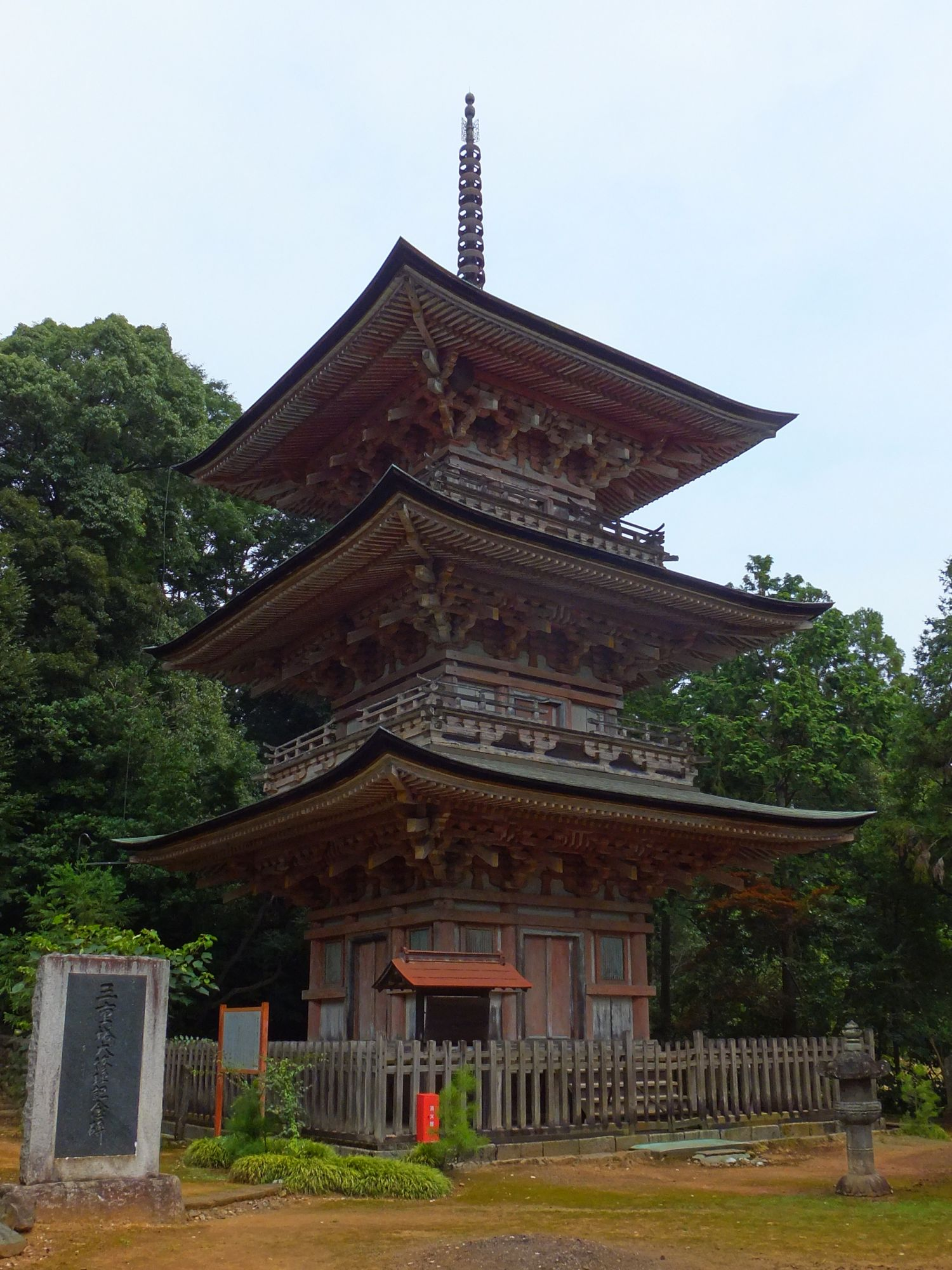
Three-story Pagoda

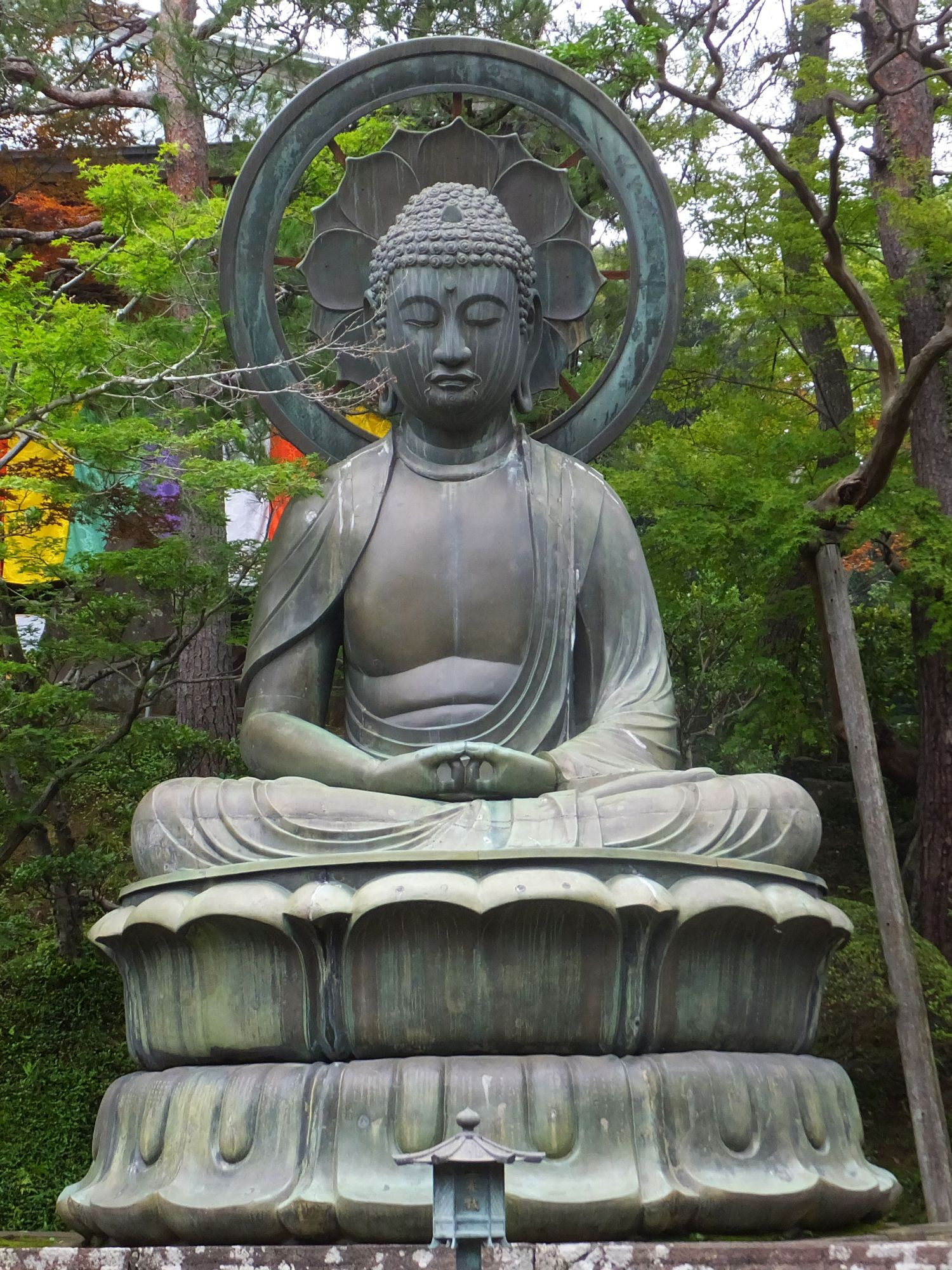
Statue of Amida Nyorai

== Bandō Sanjūsankasho (Bandō 33 temple pilgrimage) ==
The temple is the 11th temple on the 33 temple Bandō Sanjūsankasho pilgrimage route.

== Access ==
The temple is located approximately 10-minutes by car from Higashi-Matsuyama Station (Tōbu Tōjō Line).

== Cultural Properties ==
=== Saitama Prefecture Tangible Cultural Properties ===
- Three-story Pagoda (三重塔, Sanjū-no-tō), built in the Kan'ei era (1624–1644). It is the oldest structure in the temple, and has a total height of approximately 24.3 meters. It does not have a central pedestal, and the central pillar is supported by beams on the first-height ceiling. The roof used to be persimmon shingles, but it has now been replaced with a copper plate roof.
- Main Hall (本堂, Hondō), built in the Kanei era (1624–1644). Its style is that of Esoteric Buddhism, which combines Zen Buddhism with the Japanese style, and retains the style of the early Edo period with the colored patterns on each internal member. The roof was originally persimmon, but during renovations in 1922, it was changed to copper tile roofing.
- Niōmon (仁王門). The Niō statues are thought to date to 1702. During restoration work in 1996, inscribed boards were discovered listing donors who contributed to the construction of the gate in the Genroku era (1688–1704).
