= Siege of Kawagoe =

The siege of Kawagoe is the name of two sieges of Kawagoe Castle.

- Siege of Kawagoe (1537)
- Siege of Kawagoe (1545)
