= Sugaya Yakata =

Castle ruins in Saitama, Japan

- 菅谷館
- Ranzan, Saitama Prefecture, Japan
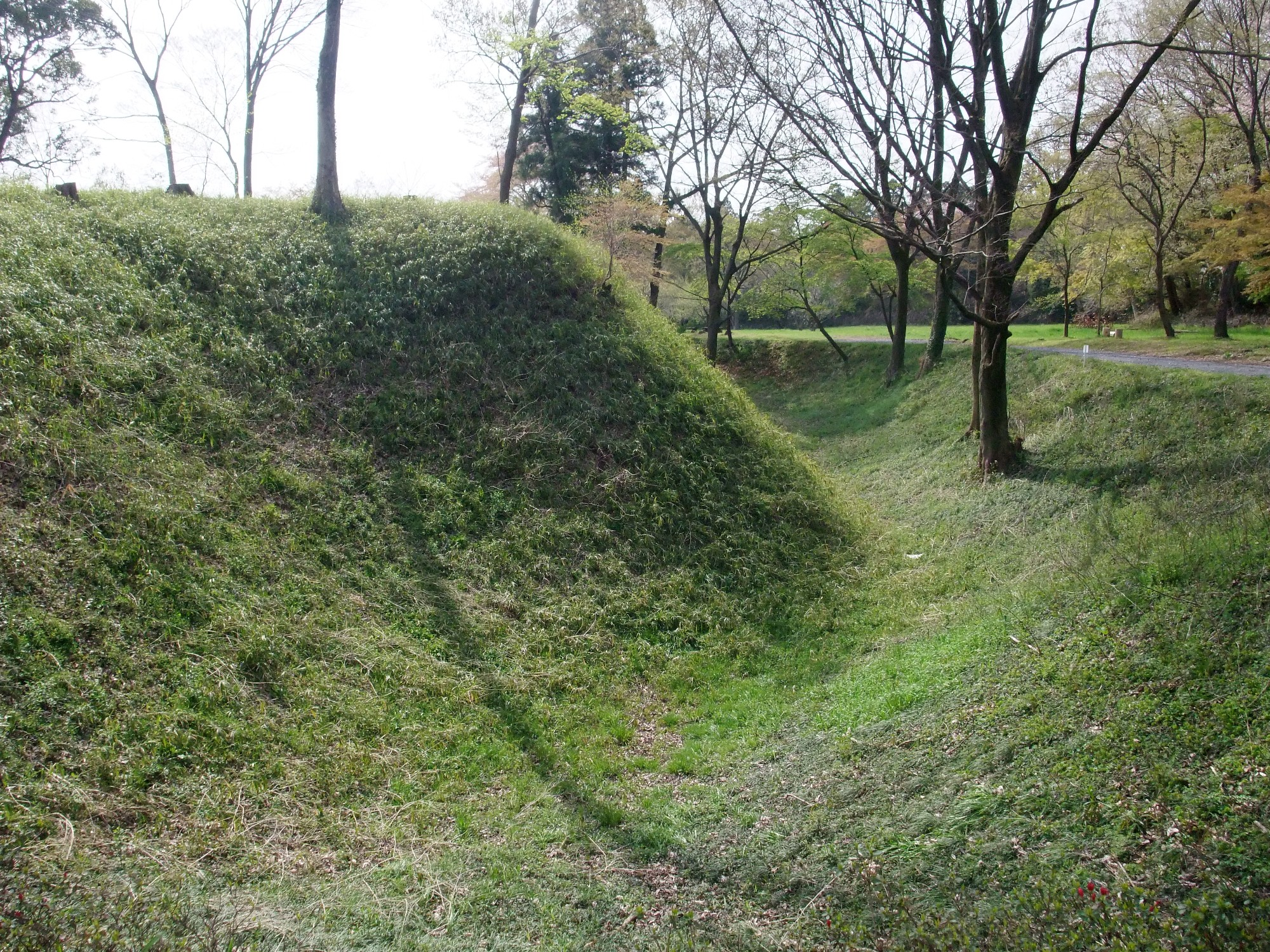
- Moat and earthen wall of Sugaya Yakata

Site information
- Type: Japanese castle
- Open to the public: yes
- Condition: ruins

Location
- Location within Saitama Prefecture Location within Japan
- Coordinates: 36°2′8″N 139°19′19″E

Site history
- In use: Sengoku period

Sugaya Yakata (菅谷館) was a Japanese castle located in what is now the town of Ranzan, Hiki District, Saitama, Japan. Its ruins have been protected as a National Historic Site, since 2008.

== Overview ==
The Sugaya Yakata was built on a river terrace of the Tokigawa river, a large tributary of the Arakawa River in the middle of Saitama prefecture, near the center of Ranzan. The fortification is located near the confluence of the Tokigawa River and with the Tsukikawa River and was on the western route of the Kamakura Kaido highway which connected various parts of the Kantō region with the capital of the Kamakura shogunate at Kamakura. The fortification was thus strategically situated to control both road and river traffic.

The inner bailey of the castle is a rectangular area of 200 by 100 meters, surrounded by a five meter high clay rampart. This area is protected by surrounding enclosures, each with ramparts and dry moats.

== History ==
Details of the origins of the castle are uncertain and tradition holds that it was originally the fortified residence of Hatakeyama Shigetada (1164-1205), an important retainer of Minamoto no Yoritomo and chieftain of the Hatakeyama clan but no relics from that period have been found in archaeological excavations.

During the Sengoku period, the area surrounding Sugaya Castle was contested between the Ogigyastsu branch of the Uesugi clan (who held Sagami province and eastern Musashi Province) and the Yamanouchi-branch of the Uesugi clan, who held northern Musashi and the prestigious title of Kantō kanrei. The conflict extended over decades, during which Sugaya Yakata and neighboring castles such as Hachigata Castle, Musashi-Matsuyama Castle and others were expanded in size and their fortifications enhanced. However, the Ogigayatsu Uesugi were defeated by the rising force of the Later Hōjō clan from Odawara at the 1546 Battle of Kawagoe and the Yamanouchi Uesugi were expelled from Musashi soon afterwards. Sugaya Yakata came under the control of Hōjō Ujikuni who maintained his seat at Hachigata Castle and used Sugaya as a secondary fortification. Sugaya Yakata largely disappears from history after this point, with no battle occurring. With the destruction of the Hōjō at the hands of Toyotomi Hideyoshi in 1590, and the subsequent transfer of the Kantō region to Tokugawa Ieyasu, Sugata Yakata was abandoned and fell into ruins.

At present, the castle site is a park with the Saitama Prefectural Ranzan Historical Museum (埼玉県立嵐山史跡の博物館) on site. A portion of the clay walls and dry moats survives. In 2008, the site received protection as one of the four "Hiki Fortified Residence Sites" in Saitama, including Sugiyama Castle, Matsuyama Castle (松山城跡), and Ogura Castle (小倉城跡) Sugaya Yakata was listed as one of the Continued Top 100 Japanese Castles in 2017.

The castle site is a 15 minute walk from Musashi-Ranzan Station on the Tōbu Tōjō Line.

== See also ==
- List of Historic Sites of Japan (Saitama)
