= Uesugi Tomosada (16th century) =

The emblem (mon) of the Uesugi clan

Uesugi Tomosada (上杉朝定; 1525 – 1546), also known as Ōgigayatsu Tomosada (扇ヶ谷朝定), was a samurai commander of the Ōgigayatsu branch of the Uesugi clan around the middle of Japan's Sengoku period.

The eldest legitimate son of Uesugi Tomooki of Ōgigayatsu, following his father's death in 1537, though he was still a child, Tomosada led an attack on the Later Hōjō clan in the Tachibana district of Musashi province. He established himself in the temple of Kandai-ji, which he fortified as a castle. However, Hōjō Ujitsuna took Kawagoe castle soon afterwards from Tomosada's uncle, Uesugi Tomonari.

Later, in the 1545 at battle of Kawagoe, Tomosada allied itself with Ashikaga Haruuji and Uesugi Norimasa of Yamauchi against Hōjō Ujiyasu. He was killed in battle, and the attempt to regain the castle for the Uesugi was ultimately unsuccessful.

With Tomosada's death, the Ōgigayatsu branch came to an end.
