= Tōmyō-ji (Kawagoe) =

Buddhist temple in Japan

Tōmyō-ji 東明寺
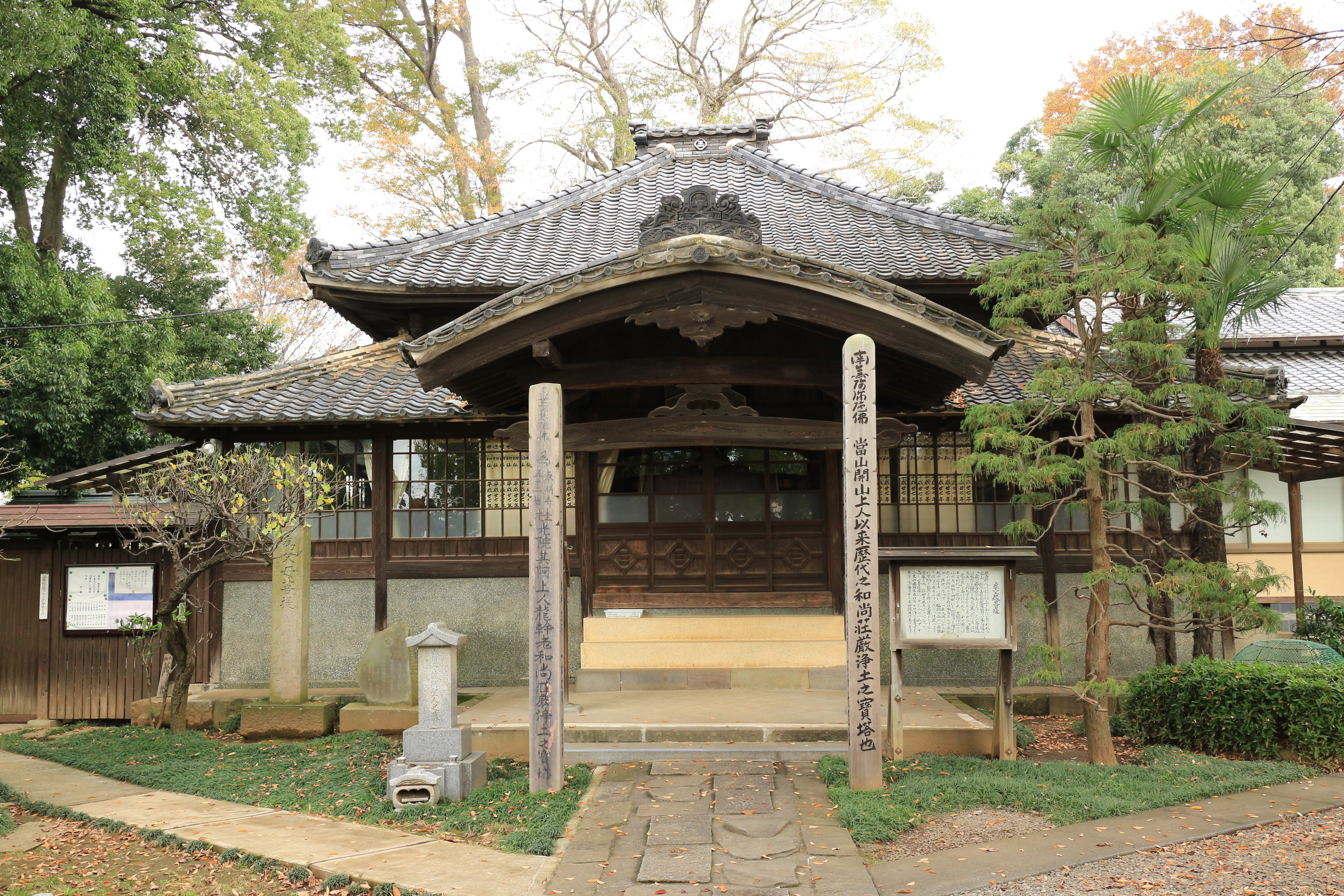

Religion
- Deity: Senju Kannon Bosatsu
- Status: Active

Location
- Location: Kawagoe, Saitama
- Country: Japan
- Interactive map of Tōmyō-ji 東明寺
- Coordinates: 35°55′44″N 139°29′05″E

Architecture
- Founder: Ippen
- Completed: 13th Century

Tōmyō-ji (Japanese: 東明寺, Hepburn: Eastern Bright Temple) is a Buddhist temple in Kawagoe, Saitama, Japan. It is noted as a principle location of the night battle during the Siege of Kawagoe Castle on April 20, 1546.

== History ==
An ancient temple founded by the monk Ippen in the 13th century. The principal image of the temple is the Bodhisattva, created by the great monk Jikaku Daishi. Tōmyō-ji Temple was located at the eastern end of the Kawagoe Clan's estate and had a large temple estate.

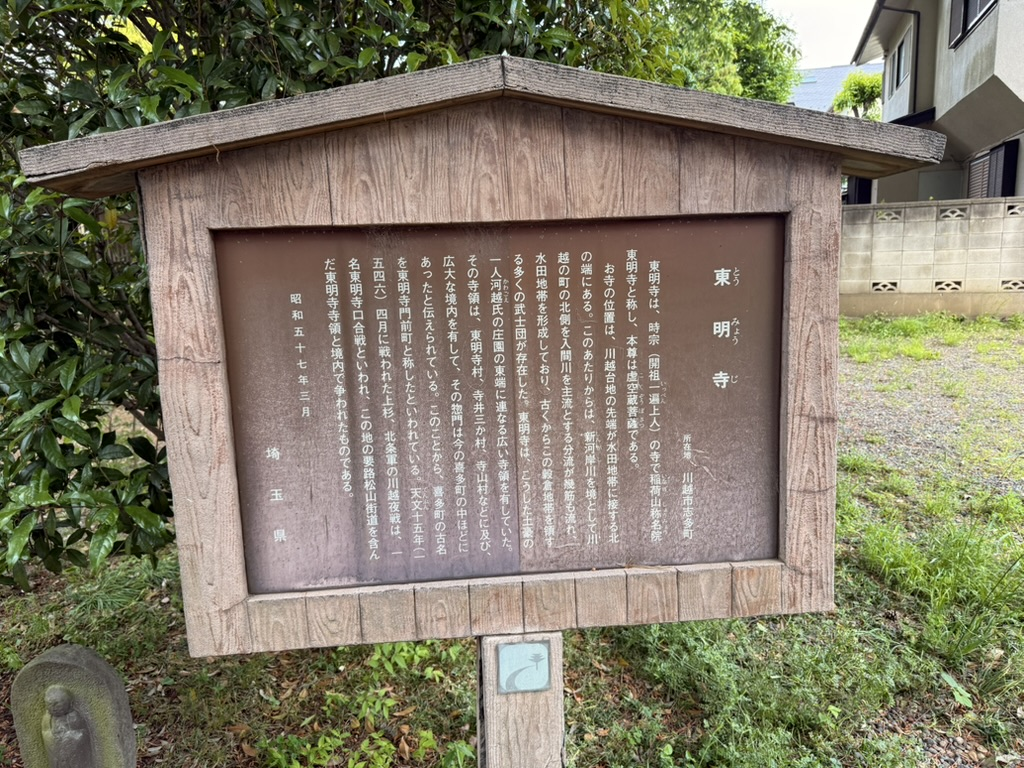
Tōmyō-ji Temple on site descriptive sign

== Kawagoe Night Battle ==
On April 20, 1546, the temple was the battlefield of the fierce Kawagoe Night Battle, which stemmed the advance of the Later Hōjō clan of Odawara into Musashi Province by the Uesugi clan. Within the temple grounds, there is a stone monument marking the site of the Kawagoe Night Battle. It is a designated historic site by Kawagoe City. In addition, a Fujizuka mound containing the remains of soldiers and a large ginkgo tree remain to this day.

=== Significance ===
The battle and site are historically significant for demonstrating the effectiveness of nighttime military operations in Japan, a relatively rare tactic at the time.

== Historical research and citations regarding the temple ==
Tōmyō-ji is listed on the official list of Kawagoe designated historic sites in recognition of its ancient history and as the location of the Kawagoe Night Battle in 1546. The battle location was confirmed in the 1750s by a mound at the temple yielding 400–500 human bones.
