= Yoshimi Hundred Caves =

Artificial caves in Saitama, Japan

- 吉見百穴 (Japanese)
- Yoshimi Hyakketsu; Yoshimi Hyaku-ana
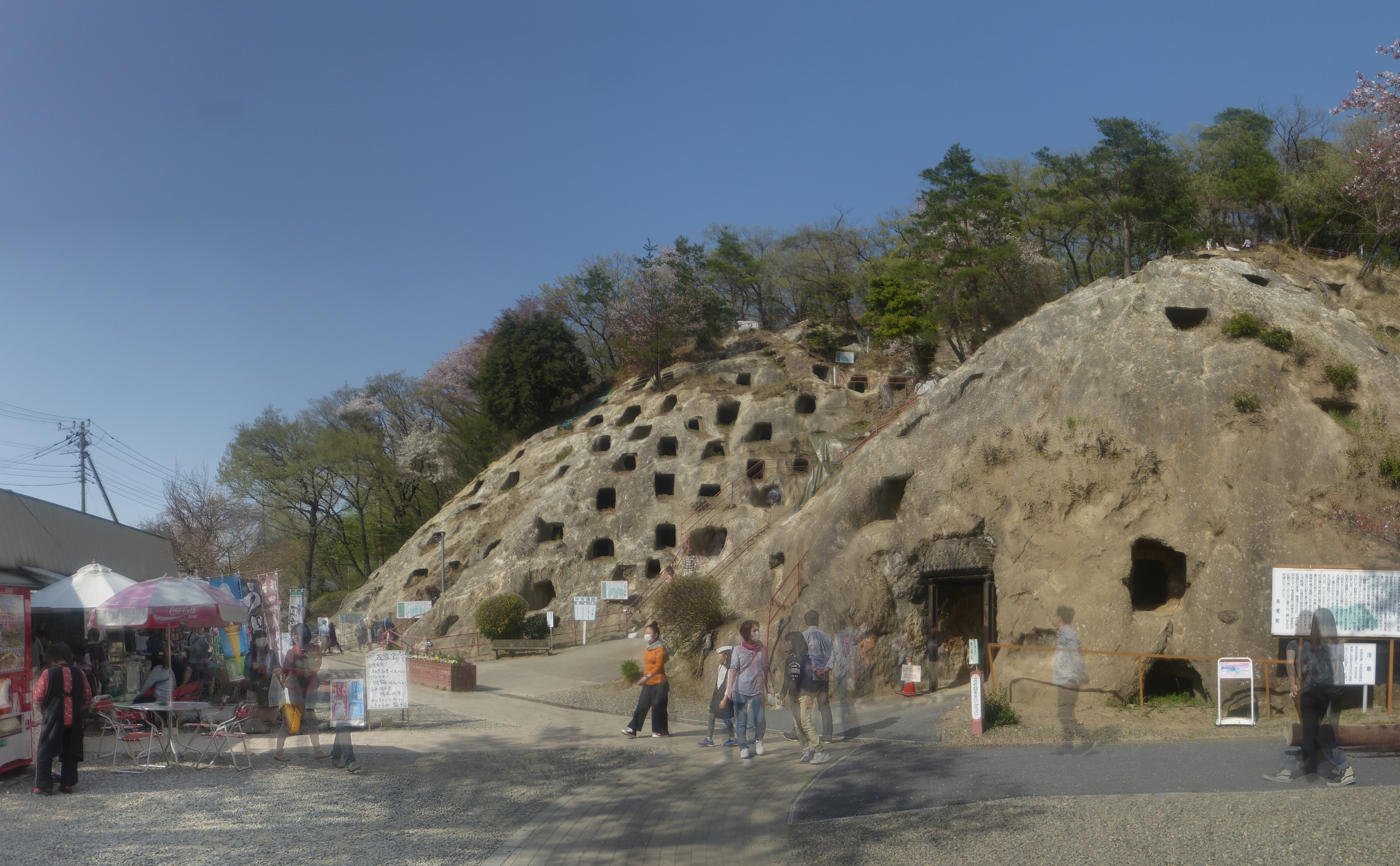
- Yoshimi Hundred Caves, 2018

- Hundred Caves of Yoshimi Yoshimi Hundred Caves (Japan)
- 36°02′21″N 139°25′18″E
- Type: necropolis
- Periods: Kofun period
- Location: Yoshimi, Saitama, Japan
- Region: Kantō region

History
- Built: 6th-7th century CE

Site notes
- Owner: Public
- Public access: Yes
- Website: www.town.yoshimi.saitama.jp/guide_hyakuana.html

The Yoshimi Hundred Caves (吉見百穴, Yoshimi Hyakketsu) is a cluster of yokoanabo tombs dug in artificial caves in a tuff cliff of located in the town of Yoshimi, Saitama, in the Kantō region of Japan. It was designated as a National Historic Site on March 7, 1923. The Schistostega luminous moss growing at the site was also designated as a Natural Monument of Japan on November 30, 1928. The site is part of Hiki Hills Prefectural Natural Park.

== Background ==
The cliff is located on the northern slope of the Yoshimi Hills (吉見丘陵, Yoshimi Kyūryō), which overlooks the Nogawa, a tributary of the Arakawa River. The tombs, which actually number 219 and not one hundred, each have an opening approximately one meter square, with a narrow entrance tunnel leading to a larger chamber within, commonly two to three meters square, but occasionally extending several meters into the hill. The graves extend in several rows running west to east along the face of the hill, with the entrances varying slightly in size due to the topography. Most have an elevated structure within the internal chamber, which may have originally held coffins or the bodies of those interred, and some chambers have multiple pedestals, indicating that the burial chamber were used for multiple burials. The entrances to the caves appear to have formerly been blocked by schist slabs.

== History ==
The Yoshimi Hundred Caves were first excavated in 1887 by Tsuboi Shōgorō, a professor at Tokyo Imperial University and one of the pioneers of Japanese archaeology and anthropology. Tsuboi found Jōmon pottery fragments, along with magatama, gold and silver rings, swords and bronze mirrors at the site, and postulated that the holes were originally cave dwellings for a race of people smaller than the modern Japanese, possibly the Koro-pok-guru people of Ainu legend, and were later converted into tombs by the invading Yamato peoples. However, his theory was challenged after further research in the 1920s, notably by Mitsutarō Shirai and other archaeologists, who argued that the structure of the caves and artifacts recovered were consistent with other late Kofun period tombs of the 7th century AD, and that there was no material evidence to indicate that the Koro-pok-guru were anything more than a folktale. In addition, similar artifacts have been found at the nearby Kaziwazaki Plateau, which contains a number of 5th to 7th century kofun burial mounds and the ruins of contemporary settlements. As the largest grave cluster in Japan it was designated as a National Historic Monument on March 7, 1923.

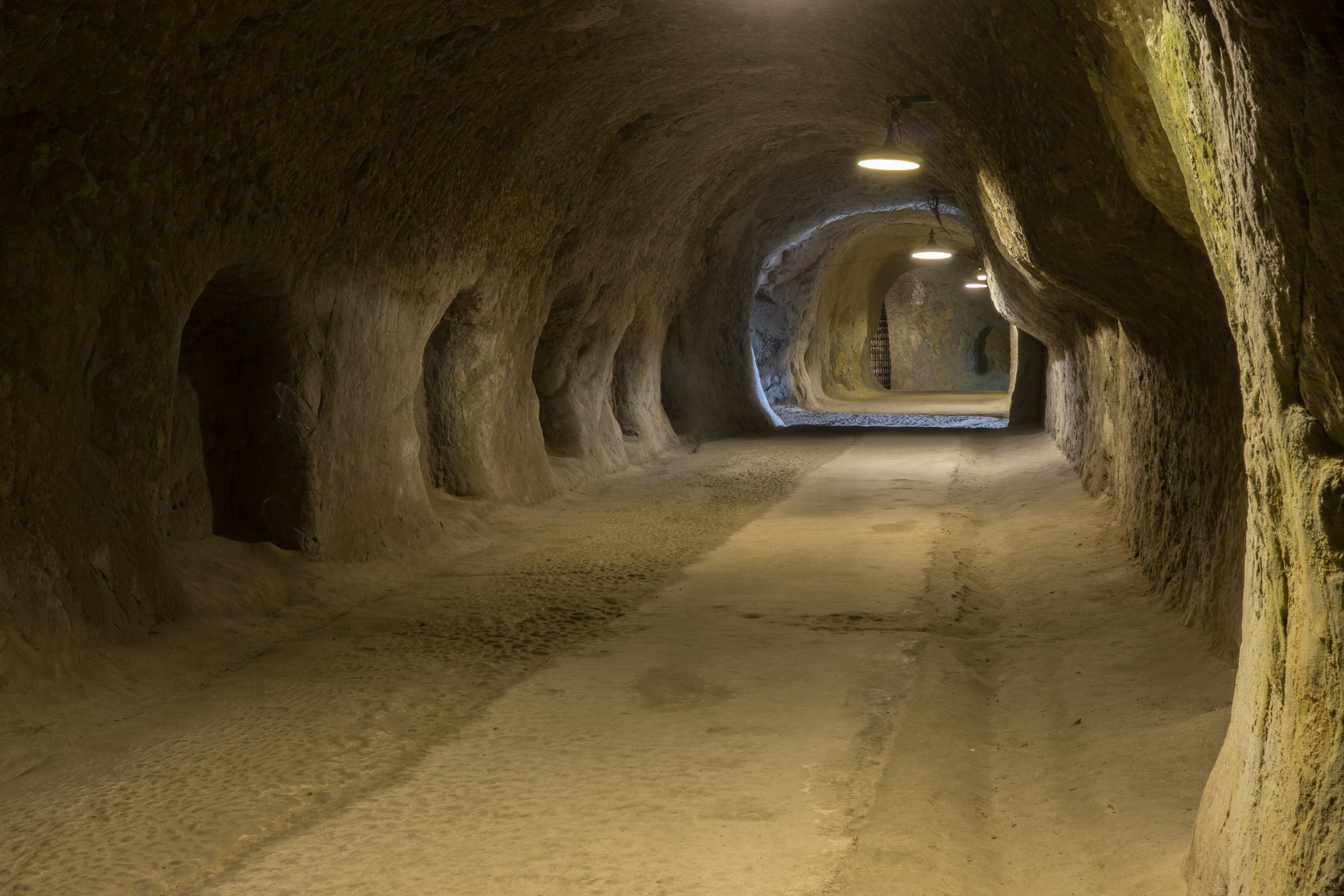
Engine factory tunnels

Despite the protected status, about one tenth of the site was destroyed during the final days of World War II, when some of the caves were enlarged in order to create an underground aircraft engine factory for Nakajima Aircraft Company by some 3,000-3,500 conscripted and volunteer laborers. The war ended before the factory came into operation.

The site is about a 20 minute walk from Higashi-Matsuyama Station on the Tōbu Tōjō Line. The site is partially open to the public.

== See also ==
- List of Historic Sites of Japan (Saitama)
