= Tamagawa Station =

Tamagawa Station may refer to:

- Tamagawa Station (Iwate) (玉川駅), Hirono Town, Kunohe District, Iwate Prefecture, connected with the JR East Hachinohe Line
- Tamagawa Station (Osaka) (玉川駅), Fukushima-ku, Osaka, connected with the Osaka Municipal Subway Sennichimae Line
- Tamagawa Station (Tokyo) (多摩川駅), Den'en-Chofu, Ota, Tokyo, connected with the Tokyu Toyoko Line, the Tokyu Meguro Line, and the Tokyu Tamagawa Line
