= Tamagawa, Saitama =

Dissolved municipality in Saitama prefecture, Japan

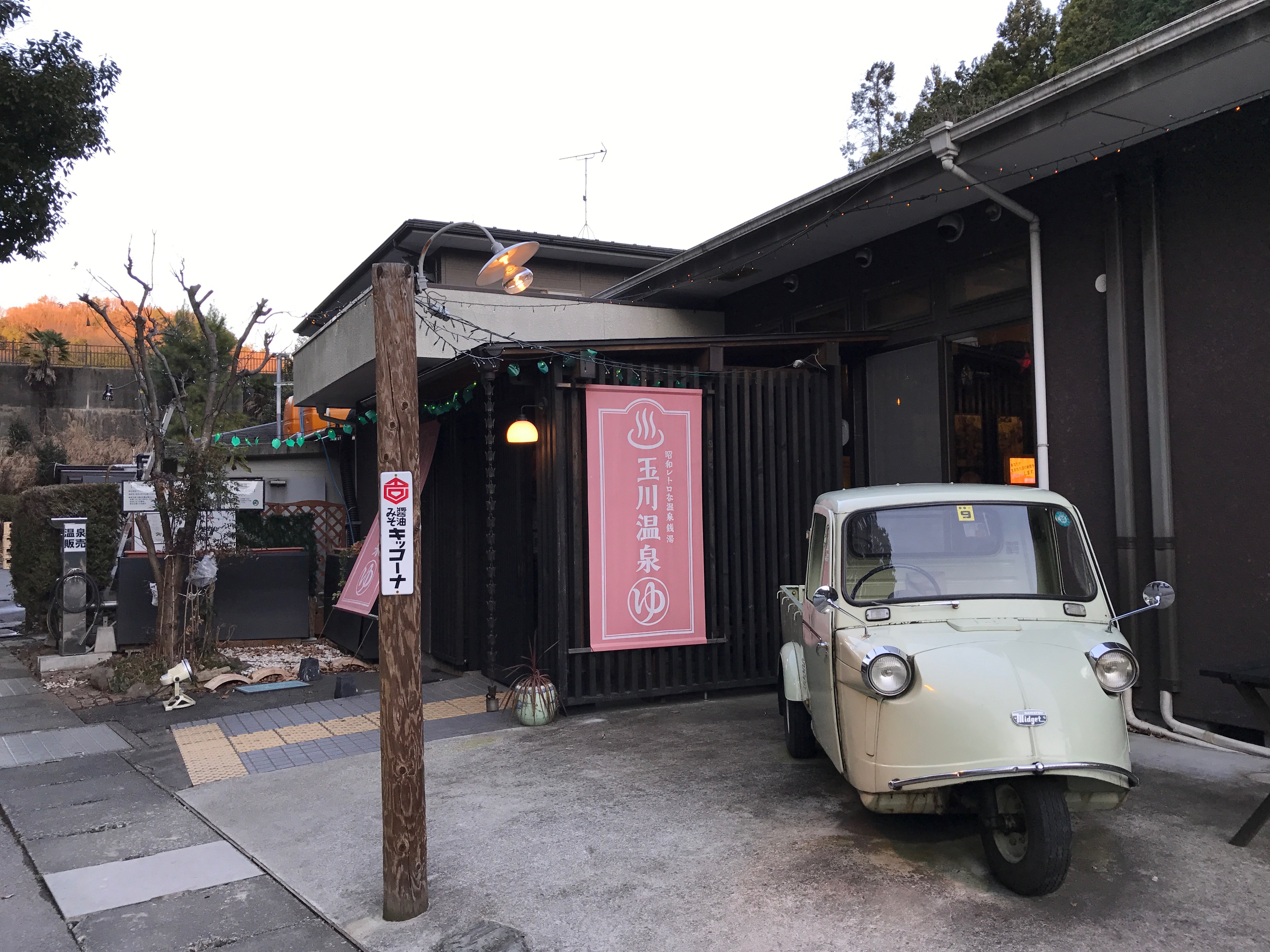
Tamagawa Onsen

Tamagawa (玉川村, Tamagawa-mura) was a village located in Hiki District, Saitama Prefecture, Japan.

As of 2003, the village had an estimated population of 5,568 and a density of 387.20 persons per km^{2}. The total area was 14.38 km^{2}.

On February 1, 2006, Tamagawa, along with the former village of Tokigawa (also from Hiki District), was merged to create the new town of Tokigawa.
