= Ranzan =

Ranzan 嵐山町
- Town
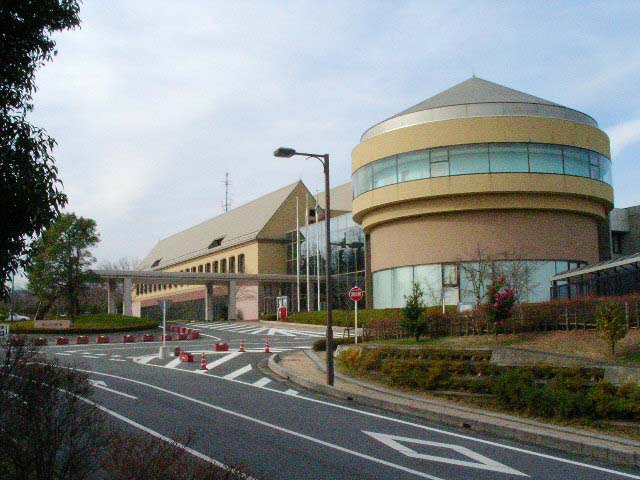
- Ranzan town office

- Flag Seal

- Location of Ranzan in Saitama Prefecture

- Coordinates: 36°3′23.5″N 139°19′13.8″E
- Country: Japan
- Region: Kantō
- Prefecture: Saitama
- District: Hiki

Area
  - Total: 29.92 km^{2} (11.55 sq mi)

Population (February 2021)
  - Total: 17,755
  - Density: 593.4/km^{2} (1,537/sq mi)
- Time zone: UTC+9 (Japan Standard Time)
- Tree: Prunus mume
- Flower: Azalea
- Phone number: 0493-62-2150
- Address: 1030-1 Sugiyama, Ranzan-machi, Hiki-gun, Saitama-ken 355-0211
- Website: Official website

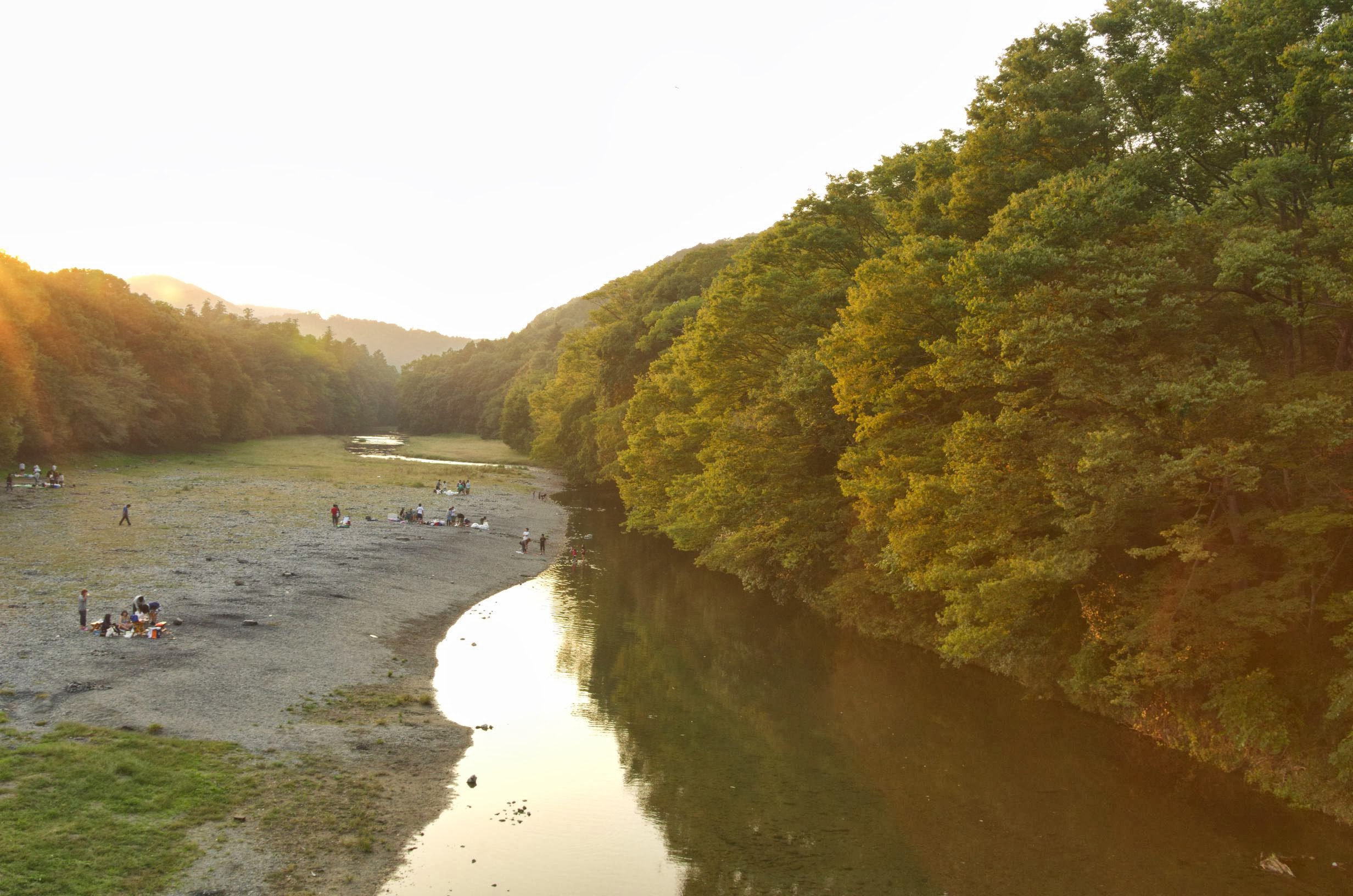
Ranzan Gorge

Ranzan (嵐山町, Ranzan-machi) is a town located in Saitama Prefecture, Japan. As of 1 March 2021, the town had an estimated population of 17,755 in 8150 households and a population density of 590 persons per km^{2}. The total area of the town is 29.92 square kilometres (11.55 sq mi).

== Geography ==
Ranzan is located in central Saitama Prefecture. The Higashimatsuyama Plateau extends to the central and northern parts of the town.

=== Surrounding municipalities ===
Saitama Prefecture

- Fukaya
- Hatoyama
- Higashimatsuyama
- Kumagaya
- Namegawa
- Ogawa
- Tokigawa
- Yorii

=== Climate ===
Ranzan has a humid subtropical climate (Köppen Cfa) characterized by warm summers and cool winters with light to no snowfall. The average annual temperature in Ranzan is 14.0 °C. The average annual rainfall is 1746 mm with September as the wettest month. The temperatures are highest on average in August, at around 25.6 °C, and lowest in January, at around 2.5 °C.

== Demographics ==
Per Japanese census data, the population of Ranzan peaked around the year 2000 and has declined since.

Historical population
Year	Pop.	±%
1920	6,974	—
1930	7,268	+4.2%
1940	7,509	+3.3%
1950	9,377	+24.9%
1960	9,014	−3.9%
1970	10,465	+16.1%
1980	16,080	+53.7%
1990	18,265	+13.6%
2000	19,816	+8.5%
2010	18,887	−4.7%
2020	17,889	−5.3%

== History ==
The villages of Sugaya and Nanasato were created within Hiki District, Saitama with the establishment of the modern municipalities system on April 1, 1889. The two villages merged on April 15, 1955 as Sugaya village, which was elevated to town status on April 15, 1967, taking the name of Ranzan.

== Government ==
Ranzan has a mayor-council form of government with a directly elected mayor and a unicameral town council of 13 members. Ranzan, together with the towns of Tokigawa, Ogawa and Namekawa, contributes one member to the Saitama Prefectural Assembly. In terms of national politics, the town is part of Saitama 10th district of the lower house of the Diet of Japan.

== Economy ==
The economy of Ranzan is primarily agricultural; however, the town also have a large industrial park. Toppan Printing, Matsuya Foods and Myojo Foods are major employers.

== Education ==
Ranzan has three public elementary schools and two public middle schools operated by the town government. The town does not have a public high school, however, there is one private middle school and one private high school.

== Transportation ==
=== Railway ===
Tōbu Railway - Tōbu Tōjō Line

- Musashi-Ranzan

=== Highway ===
- Kan-etsu Expressway
- National Route 254

== Local attractions ==
- Site of Sugaya Yakata, National Historic Site
- Site of Sugiyama Castle, National Historic Site
