= Tamagawa (surname) =

Tamagawa (written: 玉川 or 玉河) is a Japanese surname. Notable people with the surname include:

- Tamagawa Chōtatsu (玉川 王子, 1826–1862), Ryukyuan prince
- Isao Tamagawa (玉川 伊佐男, 1922–2004), Japanese actor
- Sakiko Tamagawa (玉川 紗己子, born 1962), Japanese voice actress
- Tsuneo Tamagawa (玉河 恒夫, born 1925), Japanese mathematician
