= Tamagawa Line =

The Tamagawa Line may refer to either of the following railway and tramway lines in Tokyo, Japan:

- Tamagawa Line operated by Seibu Railway
- Tamagawa Line (tramway) formerly operated by Tokyu Corporation, a surviving branch of which is the Tōkyū Setagaya Line
- Tōkyū Tamagawa Line operated by Tokyu Corporation
