= Heike Nokyo =

Collection of Buddhist religious texts

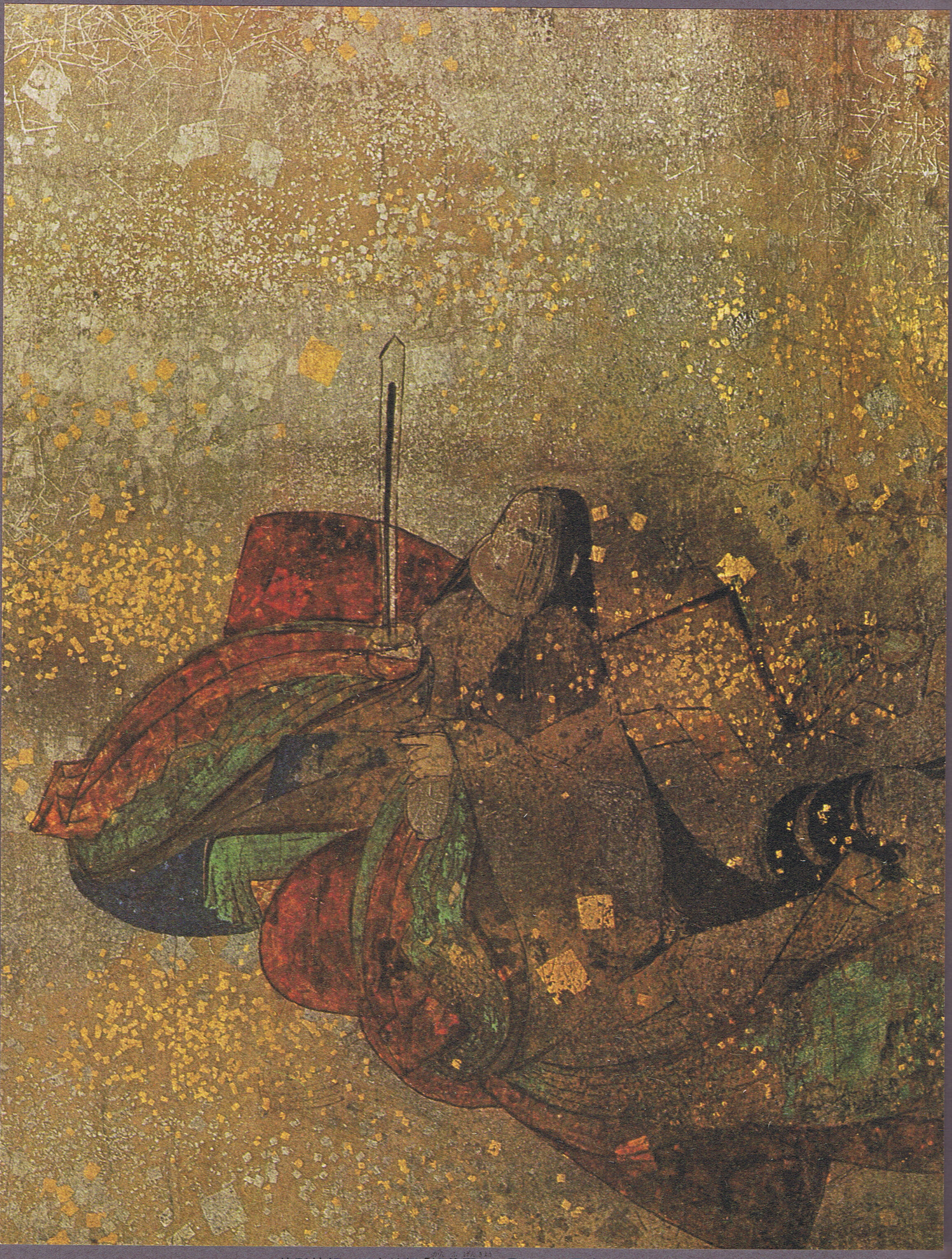
Heikenoukyou

The Heike Nōkyō 平家納経, is a collection of Buddhist religious texts in Japan from the late Heian period. These texts include 33 scrolls of the Lotus Sutra, one Amitabha Sutra scroll, one Heart Sutra scroll and one prayer scroll dedicated to the Itsukushima Shrine. The Nōkyō is written in a form of Japanese known in English as Classical Japanese.

It has had a profound influence on Japanese culture and Japanese art and was created during a golden age of Japanese art history. It is one of the masterpieces of decorated sutras ( sôshoku kyô ) of the Heian period Emakimono texts and is considered a National Treasure of Japan.

== History and development ==
The Nōkyō was commissioned by the Taira clan and dedicated by Taira no Kiyomori (1118-81CE) to Itsukushima Shrine in 1164CE in a prayer scroll (Heike Nogyo). It was made by aristocratic circles in the 12th century and depicts the tale of the Heike, numbering 33 to represent the 33 goddesses found at Itsukushima who were said to take the form of Kannon. The Nokyo was written in Classical Japanese, Classical Chinese and the Kana script formatted as Ashida-E (reed writing) representing a votive and religious work of Heian-specific Art.

In 1602, the Rinpa painter Tawaraya Sotatsu was commissioned to restore the Nokyo which affected his painting.

== Gallery ==
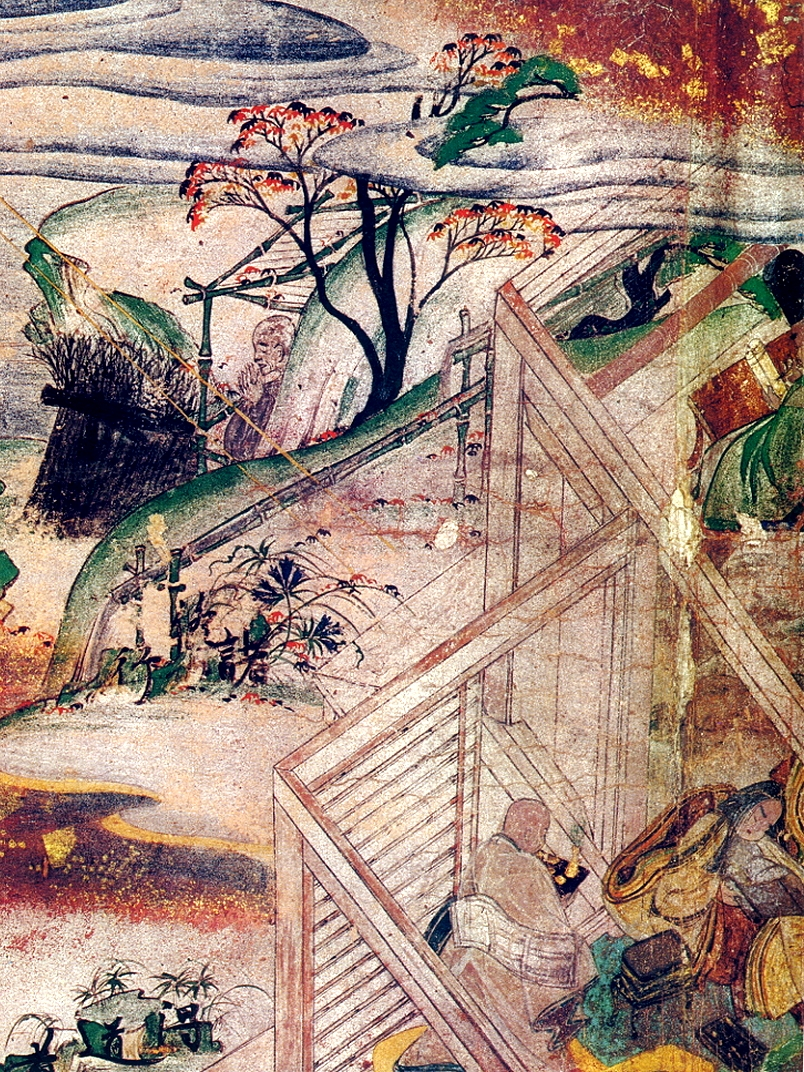
Lotus Sutra Prologue

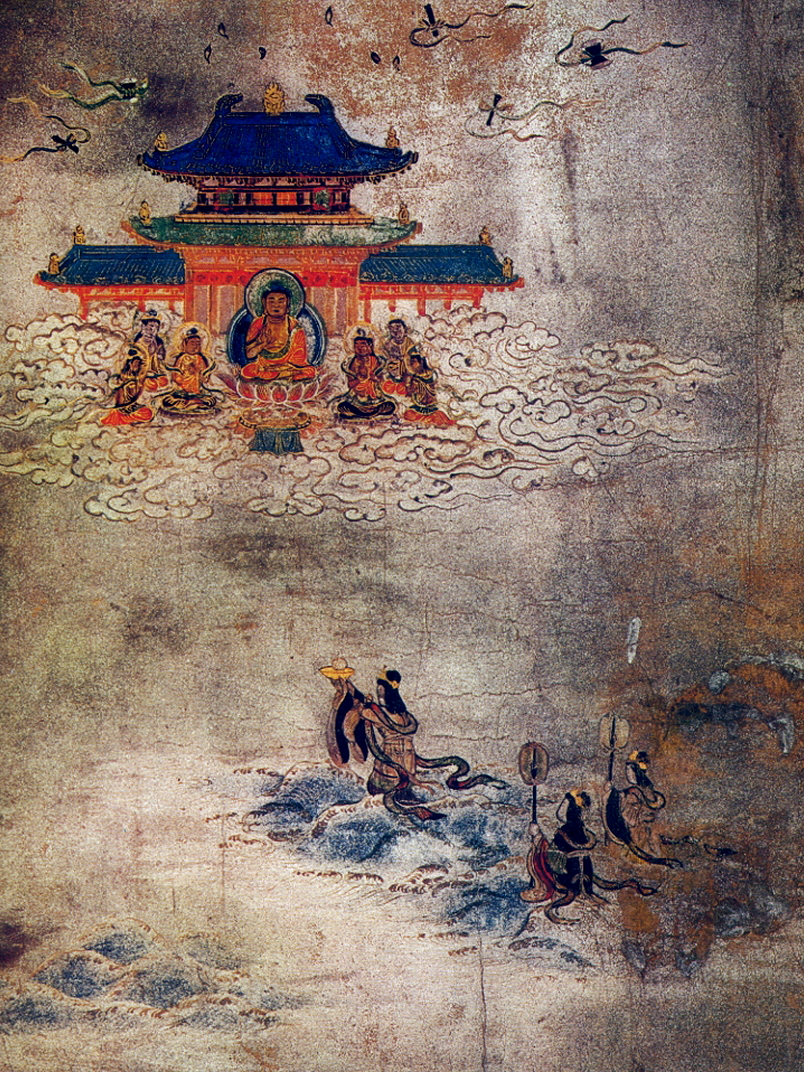
Chapter 12 Lotus Sutra

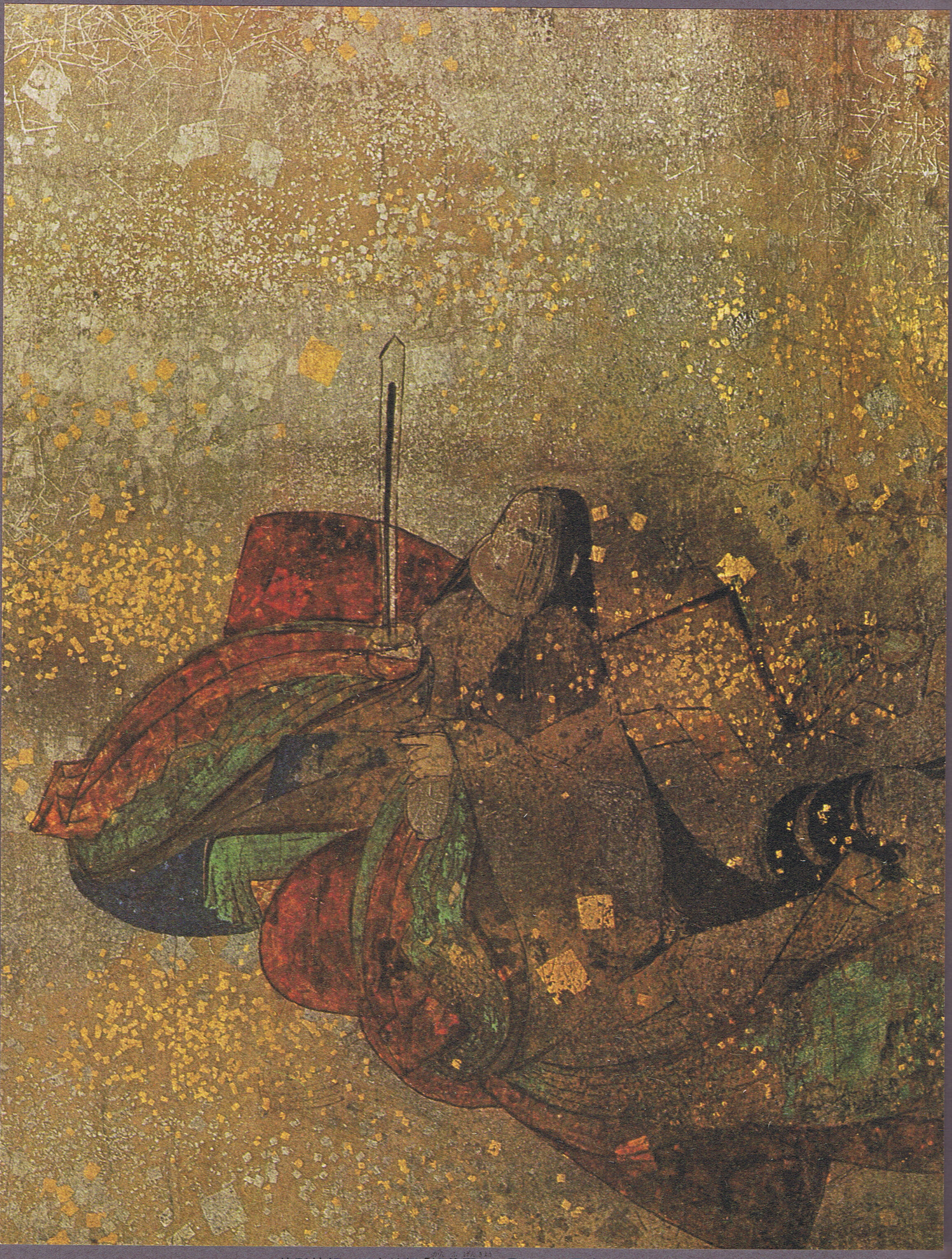
Woman from Chapter 12

== See also ==
- Tale of Genji
- Japanese painting
- Heian period
- History of Japanese art
- Nara Research Institute for Cultural Properties
- Tokyo Research Institute for Cultural Properties
