= Tokigawa =

Tokigawa ときがわ町
- Town
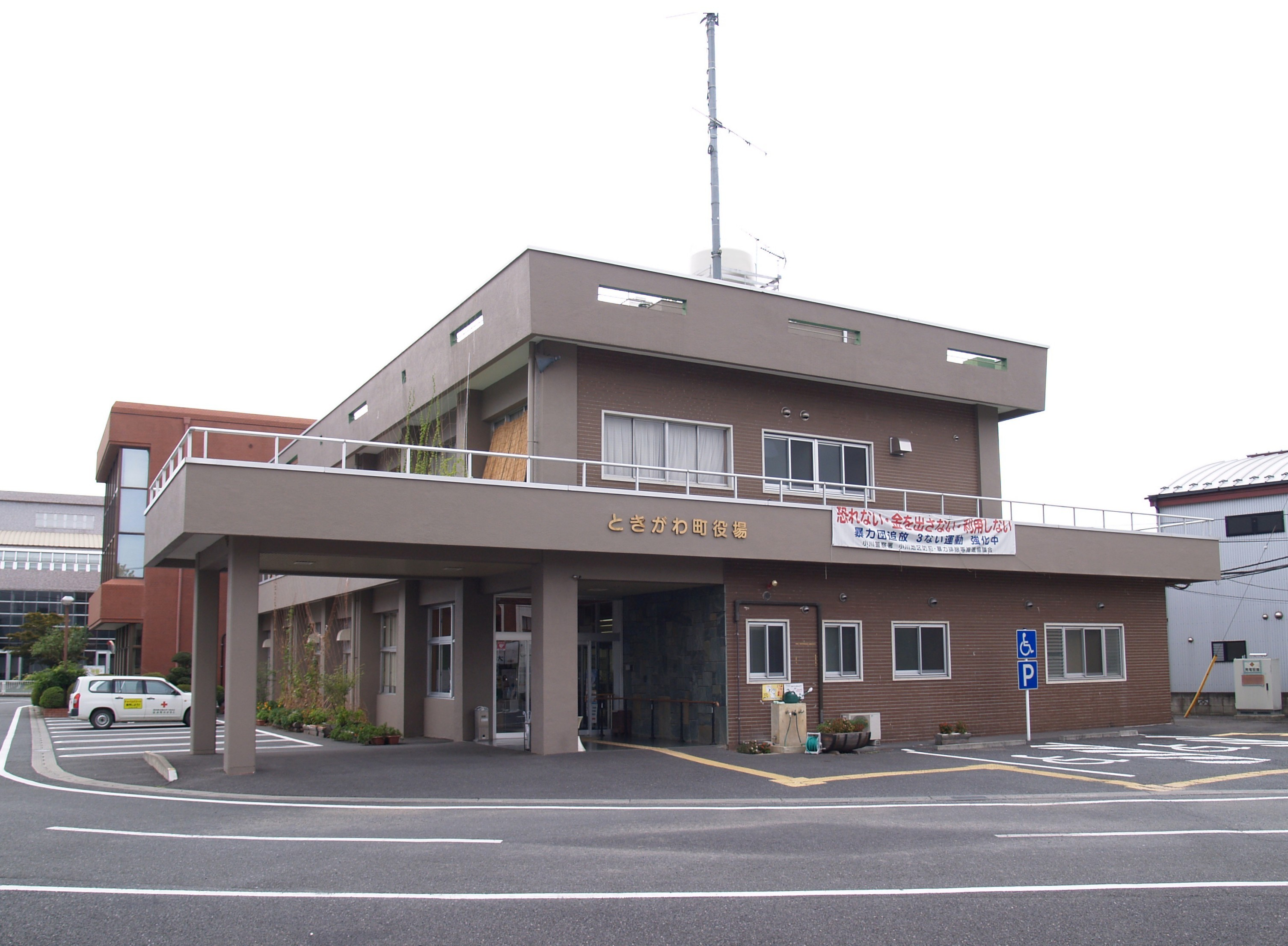
- Tokigawa town office

- Flag Seal

- Location of Tokigawa in Saitama Prefecture

- Location within Japan
- Coordinates: 36°0′31″N 139°17′48.5″E
- Country: Japan
- Region: Kantō
- Prefecture: Saitama
- District: Hiki

Area
  - Total: 55.90 km^{2} (21.58 sq mi)

Population (March 2021)
  - Total: 10,880
  - Density: 194.6/km^{2} (504.1/sq mi)
- Time zone: UTC+9 (Japan Standard Time)
- Tree: Japanese maple
- Flower: Rhododendron
- Bird: Common kingfisher
- Phone number: 0493-65-1521
- Address: 2490 Tamagawa, Tokigawa-machi, Hiki-gun, Saitama-ken 355-0395
- Website: Official website

Tokigawa (ときがわ町, Tokigawa-machi) is a town located in Saitama Prefecture, Japan. As of 1 March 2021, the town had an estimated population of 10,880 in 4750 households and a population density of 190 persons per km^{2}. The total area of the town is 55.90 square kilometres (21.58 sq mi).

== Geography ==
Tokigawa is located in central Saitama Prefecture.

=== Surrounding municipalities ===
Saitama Prefecture

- Chichibu
- Hannō
- Hatoyama
- Higashichibu
- Ogawa
- Ogose
- Ranzan
- Yokoze

=== Climate ===
Tokigawa has a humid subtropical climate (Köppen Cfa) characterized by warm summers and cool winters with light to no snowfall. The average annual temperature in Tokigawa is 13.8 °C. The average annual rainfall is 1746 mm with September as the wettest month. The temperatures are highest on average in August, at around 25.4 °C, and lowest in January, at around 2.3 °C.

== Demographics ==
Per Japanese census data, the population of Tokigawa peaked around the year 2000 and has declined slightly in the decades since.

Historical population
Year	Pop.	±%
1920	9,929	—
1930	9,898	−0.3%
1940	9,740	−1.6%
1950	11,772	+20.9%
1960	11,120	−5.5%
1970	10,414	−6.3%
1980	11,131	+6.9%
1990	13,489	+21.2%
2000	13,966	+3.5%
2010	12,418	−11.1%
2020	10,540	−15.1%

== History ==
The villages of Myōkaku and Tamagawa were created within Hiki District, Saitama with the establishment of the modern municipalities system on April 1, 1889. Myōkaku merged with the village of Okunugi from Chichibu District to form the village of Tokigawa on February 1, 1955. Tokigawa and Tamagawa merged to form the town of Tokigawa on February 1, 2006.

== Government ==
Tokigawa has a mayor-council form of government with a directly elected mayor and a unicameral town council of 12 members. Tokigawa, together with the towns of Ranzan, Ogawa and Namekawa, contributes one member to the Saitama Prefectural Assembly. In terms of national politics, the town is part of Saitama 9th district of the lower house of the Diet of Japan.

== Economy ==
Tokigawa is a rural, agricultural community.

== Education ==
Tokigawa has three public elementary schools and two public middle schools operated by the town government. The town does not have a high school.

== Transportation ==
=== Railway ===
JR East – Hachikō Line

- Myōkaku

=== Highway ===
Tokigawa is not served by any expressways or national highways

== Local attractions ==
- Jiko-ji, one of the Bandō Sanjūsankasho temples
- Tamagawa onsen
- Tokigawa onsen
