= Sugiyama Castle =

- 杉山城
- Ranzan, Saitama Prefecture, Japan
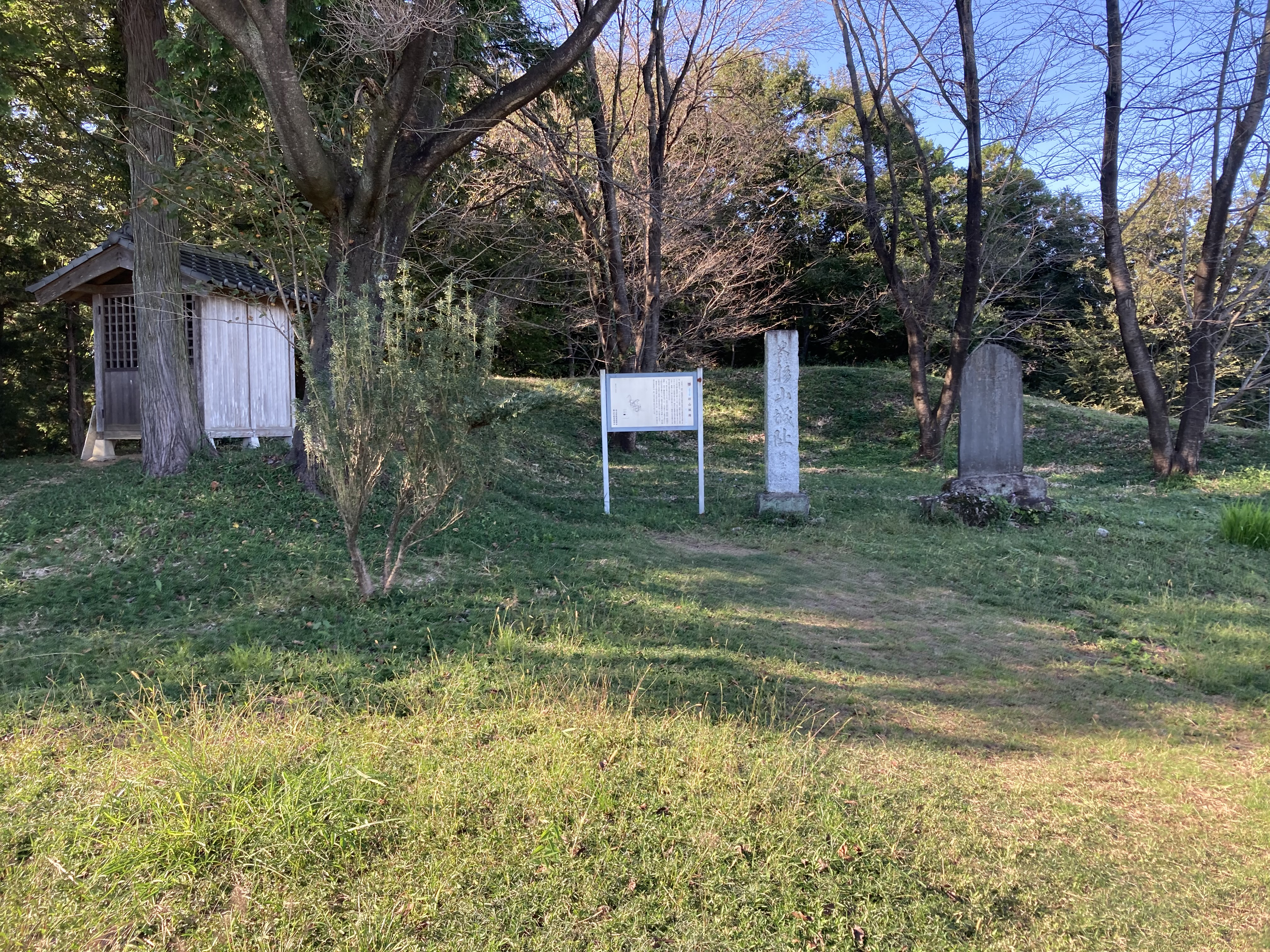
- Sugiyama Castle, 2020

Site information
- Type: Japanese castle
- Open to the public: yes
- Condition: ruins

Location
- Location within Saitama Prefecture Location within Japan
- Coordinates: 36°3′45.3″N 139°18′43.7″E

Site history
- In use: Sengoku period

Sugiyama Castle (杉山城, Sugiyama-jō), also known as Makino Castle, was a Sengoku period Japanese castle located in what is now part of the town of Ranzan, Hiki District, Saitama, in the Kantō region of Japan. The site was designated a National Historic Site. Its ruins have been protected as a National Historic Site, since 2008.

== Background ==
Sugiyama Castle in located on a hill in the town of Ranzan, near the center of Saitama Prefecture at the border of the Kantō Plain and the Chichibu Mountains. It is also located on the highway connecting Hachigata Castle in northwestern Saitama with Musashi-Matsuyama Castle. The early history of the castle has been lost and it is known when it was first constructed, or by whom. It has a typical layout for a Sengoku-period mountain castle. Situated on a long and narrow ridge, to consists of a series of enclosures built on different levels, separated by clay ramparts and dry moats, and connected by narrow, winding paths with many dead ends to confuse attackers and to permit defenders to fire back from many angles from above.

Due to its design, it was originally though that the castle was the work of the Later Hōjō clan, although arguments have been raised by historians that Hōjō castles tend to have much larger defensive engineering works, and the Uesugi clan has been advanced as another likely candidate. The date of construction is from the late 15th century to early 16th century, a period of time in which both clans contested this region. The castle was abandoned at some point in the middle of 16th century.

The castle site is a 30 minute walk from Musashi-Ranzan Station on the Tōbu Tōjō Line.

In 2008, the site received protection as one of the four "Hiki Fortified Residence Sites" in Saitama, including the Sugaya Yakata (菅谷館跡), Matsuyama Castle (松山城跡), and Ogura Castle (小倉城跡)

The castle was listed as one of the Continued Top 100 Japanese Castles in 2017.

== See also ==
- List of Historic Sites of Japan (Saitama)
