= Yoshimi, Saitama =

Yoshimi 吉見町
- Town
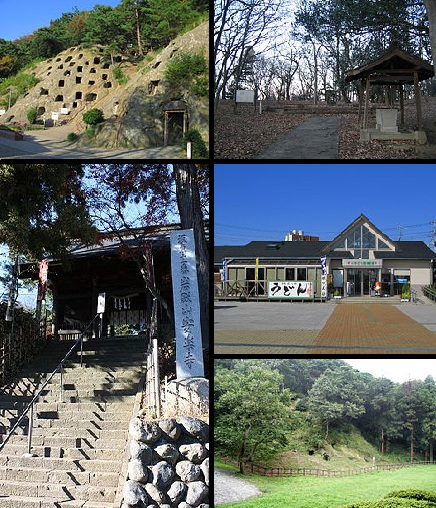
- Clockwise from top left:Yoshimi Hundred Caves, Yoshimi Matsuyama Castle, Yoshimi road station, Kuroiwa Kofun, Yoshimi Anraku-ji

- Flag Seal

- Location of Yorshimi in Saitama Prefecture

- Coordinates: 36°2′23.6″N 139°27′13.5″E
- Country: Japan
- Region: Kantō
- Prefecture: Saitama
- District: Hiki

Area
  - Total: 38.64 km^{2} (14.92 sq mi)

Population (March 2021)
  - Total: 18,594
  - Density: 481.2/km^{2} (1,246/sq mi)
- Time zone: UTC+9 (Japan Standard Time)
- Tree: Zelkova serrata
- Flower: Chrysanthemum
- Bird: Eurasian skylark
- Phone number: 0493-54-1511
- Address: 411 Hosoya, Yoshimi-machi, Hiki-gun, Saitama-ken 355-0192
- Website: Official website

Yoshimi (吉見町, Yoshimi-machi) is a town located in Saitama Prefecture, Japan. As of 1 March 2021, the town had an estimated population of 18,594 in 7800 households and a population density of 480 persons per km^{2}. The total area of the town is 38.64 square kilometres (14.92 sq mi).

== Geography ==
Located in central Saitama Prefecture on the lowlands of the upper Arakawa River, Yoshimi is noted for its strawberry production. Parts of the town are within the borders of the Saitama Prefectural Hiki Hills Nature Park.

=== Surrounding municipalities ===
Saitama Prefecture

- Higashimatsuyama
- Kawajima
- Kitamoto
- Kōnosu
- Kumagaya

=== Climate ===
Yoshimi has a humid subtropical climate (Köppen Cfa) characterized by warm summers and cool winters with light to no snowfall. The average annual temperature in Yoshimi is 14.2 °C. The average annual rainfall is 1448 mm with September as the wettest month. The temperatures are highest on average in August, at around 26.0 °C, and lowest in January, at around 2.0 °C.

== Demographics ==
Per Japanese census data, the population of Yoshimi peaked around the year 2000 and has declined since.

Historical population
Year	Pop.	±%
1920	13,045	—
1930	13,404	+2.8%
1940	13,484	+0.6%
1950	15,999	+18.7%
1960	14,915	−6.8%
1970	14,072	−5.7%
1980	16,107	+14.5%
1990	18,991	+17.9%
2000	22,246	+17.1%
2010	21,083	−5.2%
2020	18,192	−13.7%

== History ==
Archaeologists have discovered numerous Kofun period remains from the third through sixth centuries AD within the borders of Yoshimi. The villages of Higashi-Yoshimi, Minami-Yoshimi, Nishi-Yoshimi and Kita-Yoshimi were created within Yokomi District with the establishment of the modern municipalities system on April 1, 1889. Yokomi District was abolished in 1896, becoming part of Hiki District.

On July 1, 1954, the four villages merged to become the village of Yoshimi, which was elevated to town status on November 3, 1972. Attempts to merge Yoshimi with neighboring Higashimatsuyama were rejected by referendum in 2004.

== Government ==
Yoshimi has a mayor-council form of government with a directly elected mayor and a unicameral town council of 14 members. Yoshimi, together with the city of Higashimatsuyama and town of Kawashima, contributes two members to the Saitama Prefectural Assembly. In terms of national politics, the town is part of Saitama 10th district of the lower house of the Diet of Japan.

== Education ==
Yoshimi has six public elementary schools and one public middle school operated by the town government. The town does not have a high school; however, the Musashigaoka College, a junior college, is located in Yoshimi.

== Transportation ==
=== Railway ===
- Yoshimi has no passenger rail service.

=== Highway ===
- Yoshimi is not located on any national highways.

== Local attractions ==
- Anraku-ji
- The Hundred Caves of Yoshimi, National Historic Site
- Iwamuro Kannon Hall
- Kuroiwa Kofun
- site of Matsuyama Castle
- Yoshimi Onsen

== Notable people from Yoshimi ==
- Momosuke Fukuzawa, Meiji period entrepreneur
- Tomoyuki Kubota, professional baseball player
