= Siege of Kawagoe Castle =

Battle in the Sengoku period of Japan

Coordinates: 35.9244°N 139.4914°E

- Part of the Sengoku period
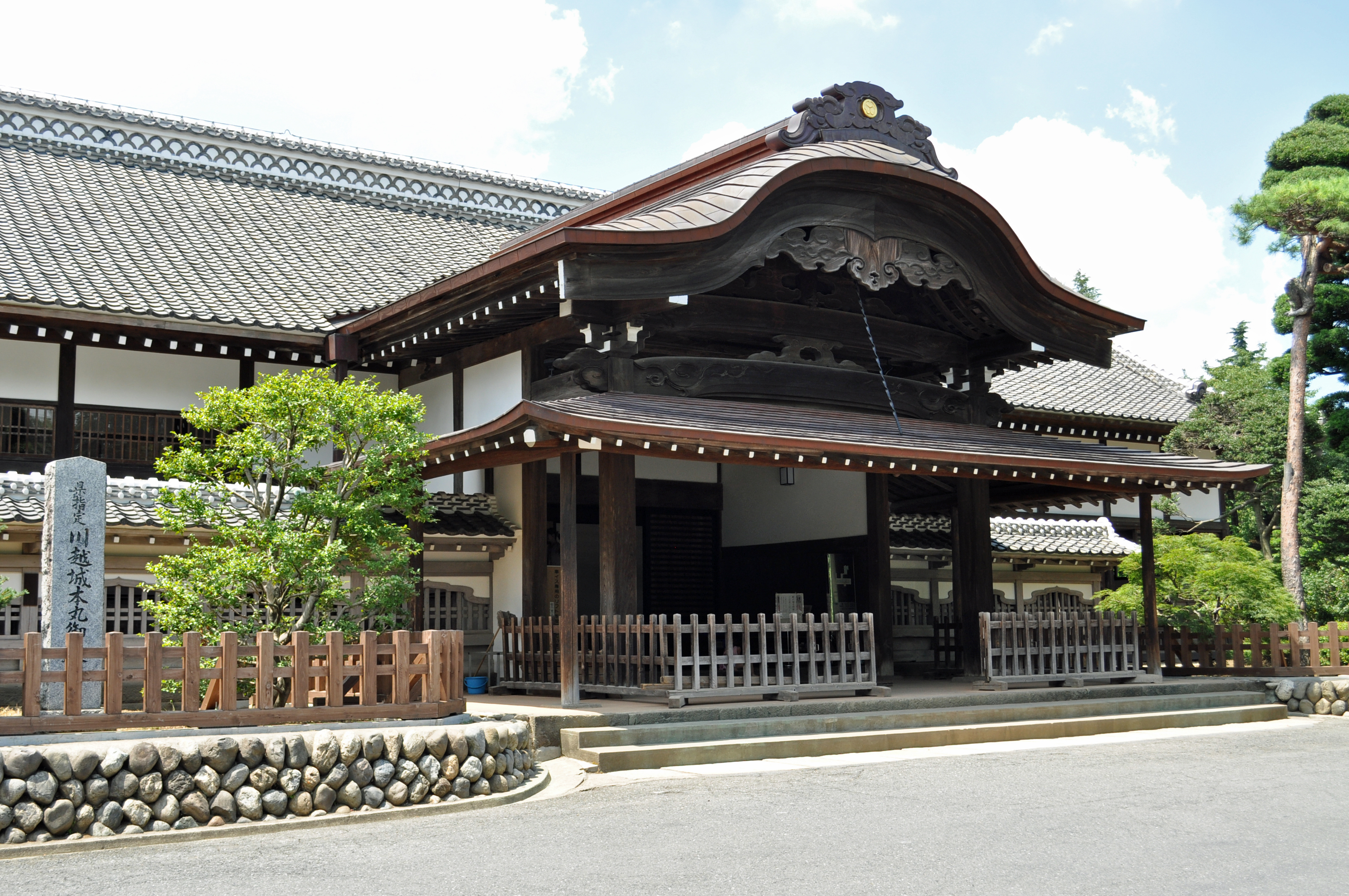
- Honmaru Goten of Kawagoe Castle
| Date | October 1545 – May 19, 1546 |
| Location | Kawagoe Castle, Musashi Province (today, Saitama Prefecture) |
| Result | Hōjō clan victory |

Belligerents
| Later Hōjō clan | Uesugi clan; Ashikaga shogunate |

Commanders and leaders
| Hōjō Ujiyasu (relief commander); Hōjō Tsunashige (garrison commander); Tame Mototada; Chiba Toshitane | Uesugi Tomosada †; Uesugi Norimasa (Kantō Kanrei); Ashikaga Haruuji (Kantō Kubō); Various Kantō Daimyo |

Strength
| Garrison: 3,000; Relief: 8,000; Total: 11,000 troops | Total: 80,000 troops |

Casualties and losses
| Unclear, presumably minimal | 13,000–16,000 killed or wounded |

The 1545–1546 Siege of Kawagoe Castle (河越城の戦い, Kawagoe-jyō no tatakai) was part of a failed attempt by the Uesugi clan to regain Kawagoe Castle from the Later Hōjō clan in the Sengoku period of Japan. Uesugi Tomosada of the Ogigayatsu branch of the Uesugi clan attacking Kawagoe castle, he was joined by his more powerful relative Uesugi Norimasa from Yamanouchi branch Uesugi clan, who held the post of Kantō Kanrei, the shōgun's deputy in the Kantō region by Ashikaga Haruuji, the Kantō kubō in Koga, and by a host of anti-Hōjō daimyō from the Kantō region.

== Background ==
The eldest legitimate son of Uesugi Tomooki of Ōgigayatsu, following his father's death in 1537, though he was still a child, Uesugi Tomosada led an attack on the Later Hōjō clan in the Tachibana district of Musashi province. He established himself in the temple of Kandai-ji, which he fortified as a castle. However, Hōjō Ujitsuna took Kawagoe castle soon afterwards from Tomosada's uncle, Uesugi Tomonari.

In 1545, Tomosada attempt to regain the Kawagoe castle for the Uesugi clan. Tomosada allied himself with Ashikaga Haruuji and Uesugi Norimasa of Yamauchi against Hōjō Ujiyasu.

== Battle ==
In April 1546, despite an overwhelming attacking force by the Uesugi clan numbering around 80,000, the 3,000 men in Kawagoe Castle's garrison, led by Hōjō Tsunashige, held off the siege until the relief force arrived. The relief force, numbering only 8,000, was led by Tsunashige's brother, Hōjō Ujiyasu. The principle location of the battle was at Tōmyō-ji (Kawagoe).

Some warriors were sent by Ujiyasu to sneak past the Uesugi siege lines to inform the garrison of the relief's arrival. Though still strongly outnumbered, ninja spies informed the Hōjō forces that the attackers, Ashikaga Haruuji in particular, had relaxed their vigilance due to their overconfidence in victory.

The Hōjō tried a risky tactic, coordinating a night attack between the garrison and the relieving force. Going against battlefield custom, the samurai were ordered to leave behind any heavy armor, which would slow them down and perhaps reveal their position, and to not bother taking the heads of their defeated enemies. This would deny the warriors much honor, as their triumphs would not be known or recorded, but the intense loyalty of the Hōjō samurai caused them to follow these orders. The tactic succeeded, Uesugi Tomosada was killed in battle, and the Hōjō foiled the siege.

== Aftermath ==
This Hōjō victory marked the decisive turning point in the struggle for the Kanto region. The Hōjō tactics which said to be "one of the most notable examples of night fighting in samurai history".

This defeat for the Uesugi would lead to the near-extinction of the family, and with Tomosada's death, the Ōgigayatsu branch came to an end.
