= Kawagoe Castle =

Castle in Japan

Kawagoe Castle 川越城
- Kawagoe, Saitama, Japan
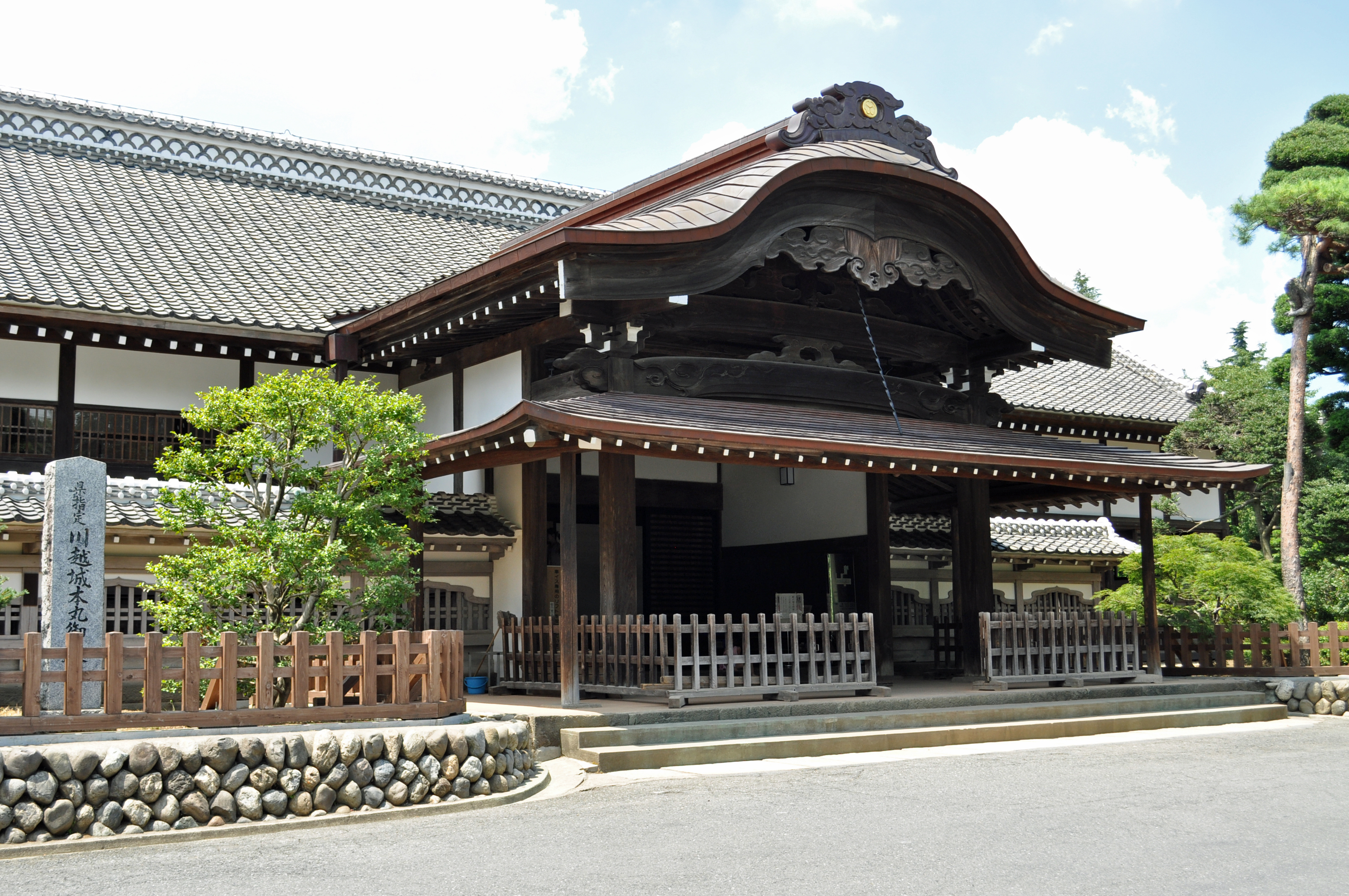

Site information
- Type: Japanese castle
- Controlled by: Kawagoe clan, Hōjō clan, Uesugi clan
- Condition: Dismantled, relocated. Some buildings remain on or near the original site.

Location
- Coordinates: 35°55′28″N 139°29′29″E

Site history
- Built: 1457
- Built by: Ōta Dōshin, Ōta Dōkan
- In use: 1457 – c.1870
- Demolished: 1870
- Battles/wars: Battle of Kawagoe (1545)-(1546)

Kawagoe Castle (川越城, Kawagoe-jō) is a flatland Japanese castle in the city of Kawagoe, in Japan's Saitama Prefecture. It is the closest castle to Tokyo to be accessible to visitors, as Edo castle is now the Imperial palace, and largely inaccessible.

== History ==
Along with a number of other castles in the region, Kawagoe saw much action in the 15th-16th centuries, as the Late Hōjō clan and two branches of the Uesugi clan vied for control of the Kantō region. In the 1450s, Kawagoe was held by the Yamanouchi branch of the Uesugi; the Ogigayatsu branch controlled nearby Shirai castle in Shimōsa Province, and the newly built Edo castle, which significantly bolstered their tactical advantages over their Yamanouchi cousins.

Decades later, when the Hōjō clan sought to gain control of the Kantō, Hōjō Ujitsuna took Edo castle in 1524, and subsequently seized Kawagoe in 1537, with the latter serving as an important base of operations. For roughly two decades after that, the Uesugi launched a number of attempts to regain the region. This culminated in the 1545 Siege of Kawagoe Castle, as the heavily outnumbered Hōjō garrison of Kawagoe defeated an attempted siege of Edo castle. This victory would lead to the end of Uesugi power in the region, and the near-total destruction of that clan.

The Hōjō having secured themselves in the region, Kawagoe served for another forty-five years as a satellite fortress defending Edo, and the clan's central castle at Odawara. Kawagoe commanded the road to Echigo province to the west, and its location on the Arakawa River and near the Edo River were important elements of its tactical significance in defending the Kantō from attacks from the north.

From the fall of the Later Hōjō until the end of the Edo period, it was the headquarters of the Kawagoe Domain.

In 1870 dismantlement of the castle began. Some of the buildings were relocated in Kawagoe and to nearby cities.

== Current status ==
Today only a mound on which a yagura, or tower, and the primary hall (本丸御殿, Honmaru Goten) still remain on the original site. In 1967 the Saitama Prefectural Government designated it as a Tangible Cultural Property. The Karō Assembly Room (家老詰所, Karō Tsumesho) was relocated back to the enclosure but not quite on the original site. It was also designated as a Tangible Cultural Property in 1991.

== Literature ==
- De Lange, William (2021). An Encyclopedia of Japanese Castles. Groningen: Toyo Press. p. 600. ISBN 978-9492722300.
- Schmorleitz, Morton S. (1974). Castles in Japan. Tokyo: Charles E. Tuttle Co. ISBN 0-8048-1102-4.
