= Hiki District =

District in Saitama prefecture, Japan

Coordinates: 36.027°N 139.304°E

Hiki (比企郡, Hiki-gun) is a district in Saitama Prefecture, Japan.

As of 2003, the district has an estimated population of 145,235 and a population density of 515.31 persons per square kilometer. The total area is 281.84 km^{2}.

== Towns ==
- Hatoyama
- Kawajima
- Namegawa
- Ogawa
- Ranzan
- Tokigawa
- Yoshimi

== History ==
At the end of the Heian Period, the Hiki clan ruled the area now within Hiki District.

On February 1, 2006, the former village of Tokigawa absorbed the village of Tamagawa to form the new town of Tokigawa.
