= Ogawa, Saitama =

Ogawa 小川町
- Town
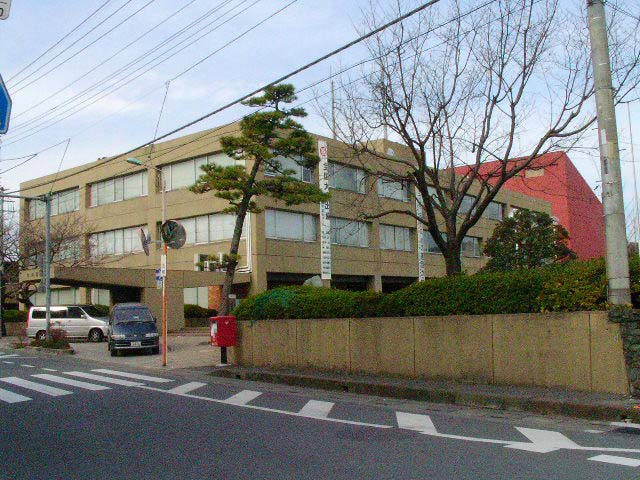
- Ogawa town office

- Flag Seal

- Ogawa (in bright yellow) in Saitama Prefecture

- Location within Japan
- Coordinates: 36°3′24″N 139°15′42.6″E
- Country: Japan
- Region: Kantō
- Prefecture: Saitama
- District: Hiki

Area
  - Total: 60.36 km^{2} (23.31 sq mi)

Population (March 2021)
  - Total: 28,971
  - Density: 480.0/km^{2} (1,243/sq mi)
- Time zone: UTC+9 (Japan Standard Time)
- Tree: Zelkova serrata
- Flower: Adonis ramosa
- Bird: Japanese white-eye
- Phone number: 0493-72-1221
- Address: 55 Otsuka, Ogawa-machi, Hiki-gun, Saitama-ken 355-0392
- Website: Official website

Ogawa (小川町, Ogawa-machi) is a town in Saitama Prefecture, Japan. As of 1 March 2021, the town had an estimated population of 28,971 in 12,989 households and a population density of 480 persons per km^{2}. The total area of the town is 60.36 square kilometres (23.31 sq mi).

== Geography ==
Ogawa is in central Saitama Prefecture in the Ogawa basin and is surrounded by the Sotochichibu Mountains. Surrounding municipalities are Ranzan, Tokigawa, Yorii and Higashichichibu, all in Saitama Prefecture.

=== Climate ===
Ogawa has a humid subtropical climate (Köppen Cfa) characterized by warm summers and cool winters with light to no snowfall. The average annual temperature in Ogawa is 14.0 °C. The average annual rainfall is 1746 mm with September as the wettest month. The temperatures are highest on average in August, at around 26.3 °C, and lowest in January, at around 3.0 °C.

== Demographics ==
Per Japanese census data, the population of Ogawa peaked around the year 2000 and has declined since.

Historical population
Year	Pop.	±%
1920	17,523	—
1930	18,451	+5.3%
1940	19,043	+3.2%
1950	25,270	+32.7%
1960	24,769	−2.0%
1970	25,641	+3.5%
1980	27,045	+5.5%
1990	33,709	+24.6%
2000	37,301	+10.7%
2010	32,913	−11.8%
2020	28,524	−13.3%

== History ==
The village of Ogawa was created within Hiki District, Saitama with the establishment of the modern municipalities system on April 1, 1889. Ogawa annexed the neighboring villages of Okawa, Takezawa and Yawata on February 1, 1955. Tokigawa and Tamagawa merged to form the town of Tokigawa.

== Government ==
Ogawa has a mayor-council form of government with a directly elected mayor and a unicameral town council of 16 members. Ogawa, together with the towns of Tokigawa, Ranzan and Namekawa, contributes one member to the Saitama Prefectural Assembly. In terms of national politics, the town is part of Saitama 10th district of the lower house of the Diet of Japan.

== Economy ==
The town used to be famous for Japanese traditional papermaking (washi).

== Education ==
Ogawa has six public elementary schools and three public middle schools operated by the town government, and one public high school operated by the Saitama Prefectural Board of Education.

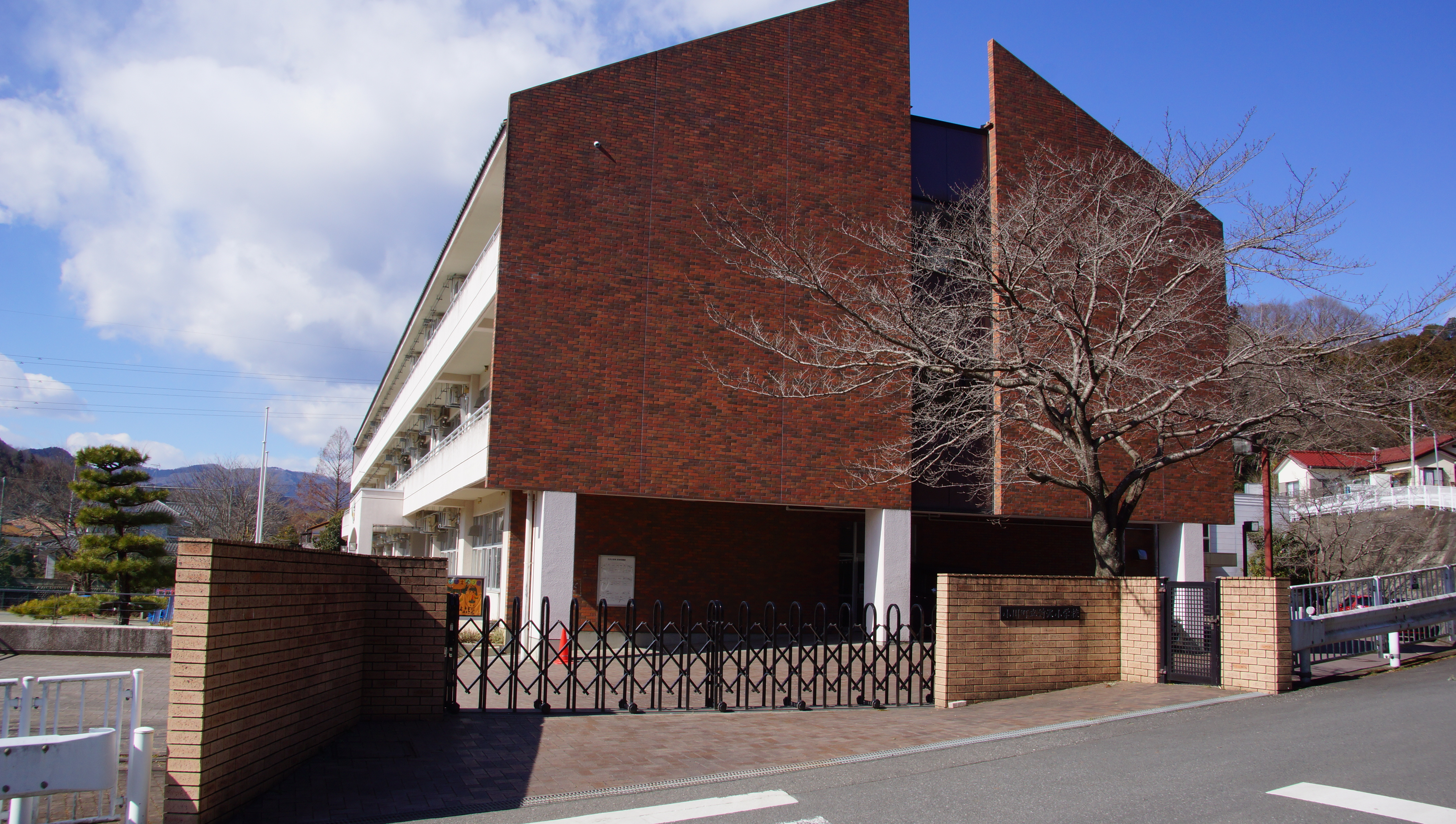
Takezawa Elementary School in Ogawa

== Transportation ==
=== Railway ===
JR East - Hachikō Line

- Ogawamachi - Takezawa

Tōbu Railway - Tōbu Tōjō Line

- Ogawamachi - Tōbu-Takezawa
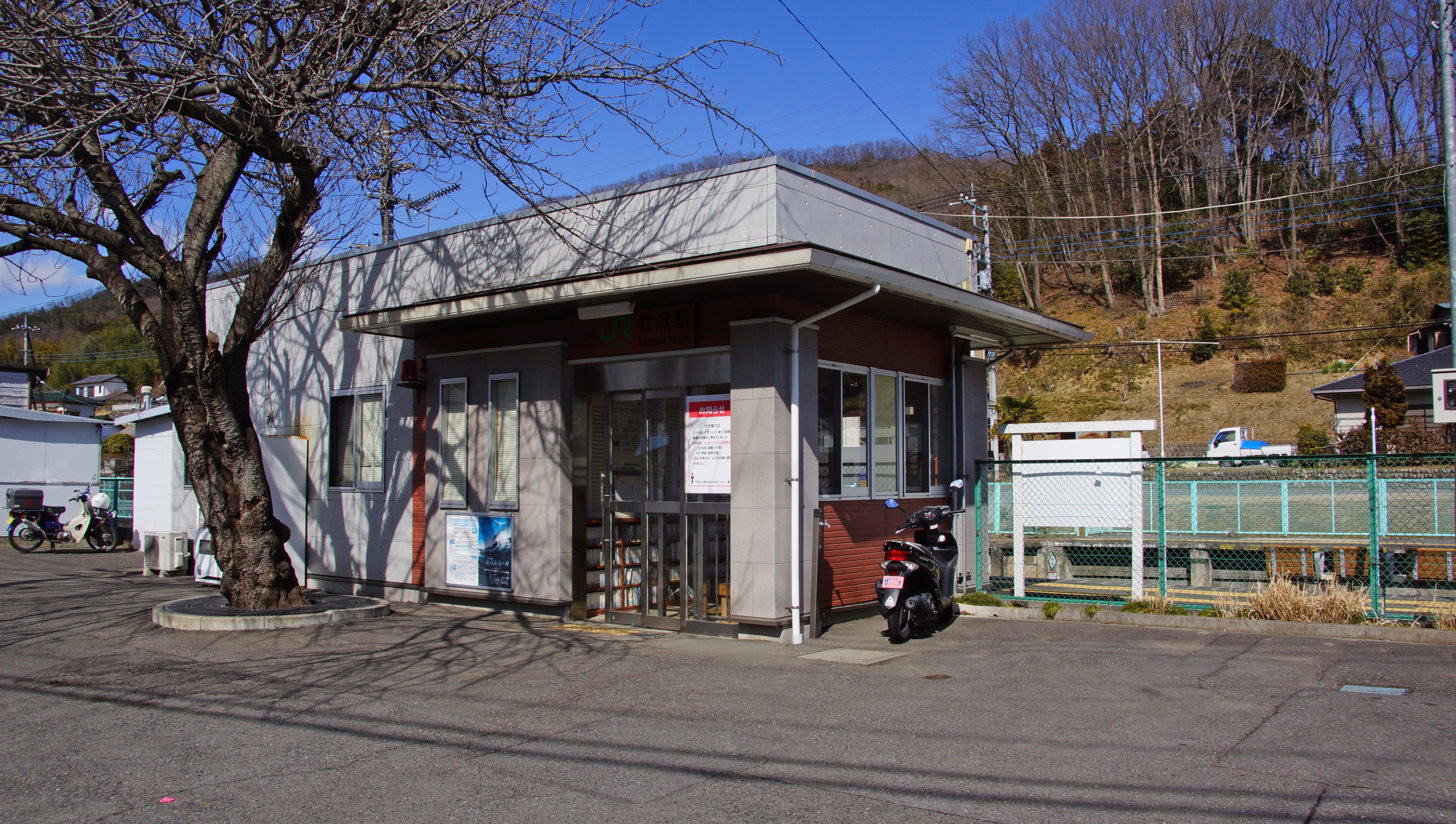
Takezawa Station in February 2017

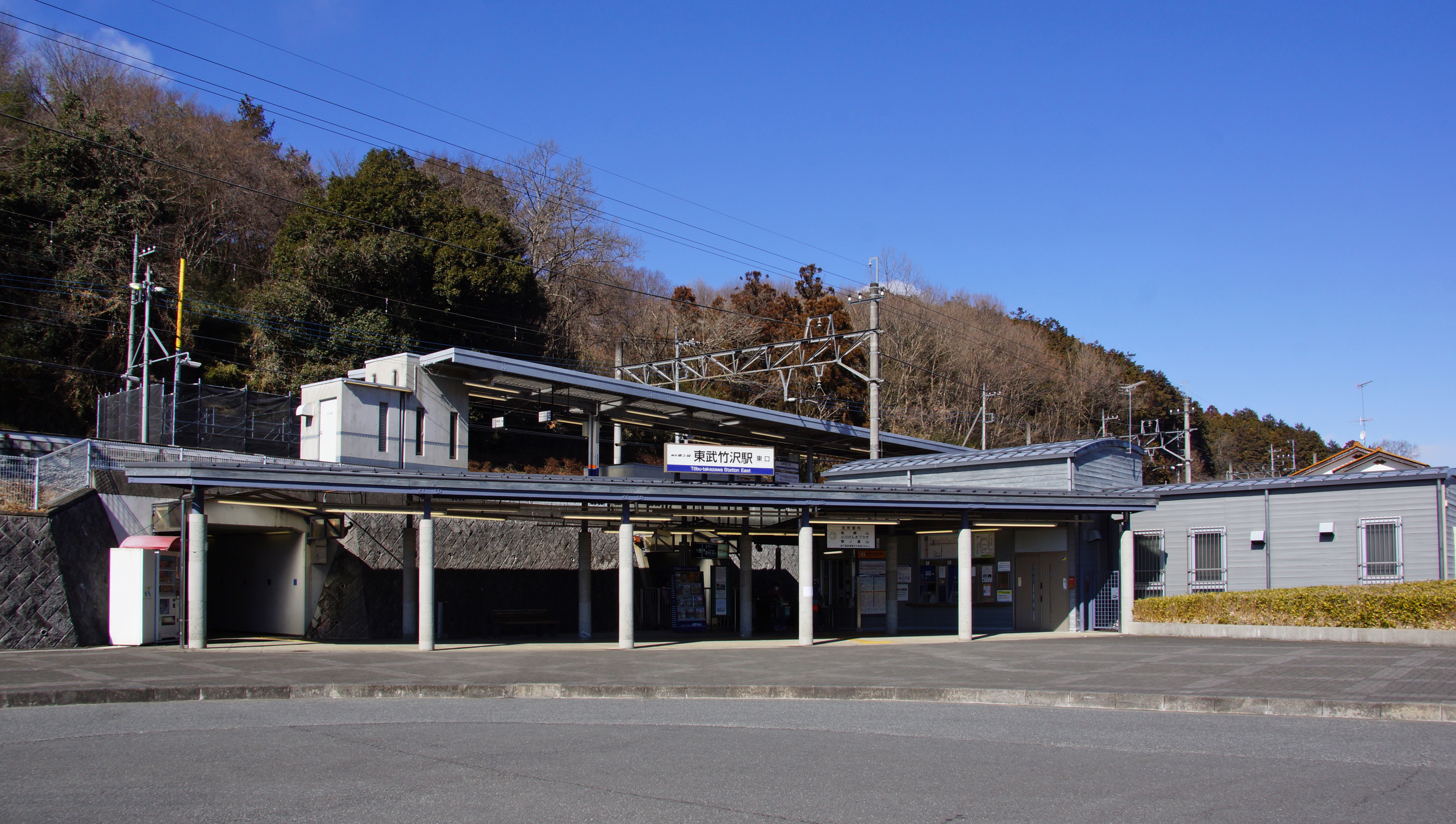
Tōbu-Takezawa Station in February 2017

=== Highway ===
- Kan-etsu Expressway
- National Route 254
