= Tōbu-Takezawa Station =

Railway station in Ogawa, Saitama Prefecture, Japan

TJ34 Tōbu-Takezawa Station 東武竹沢駅
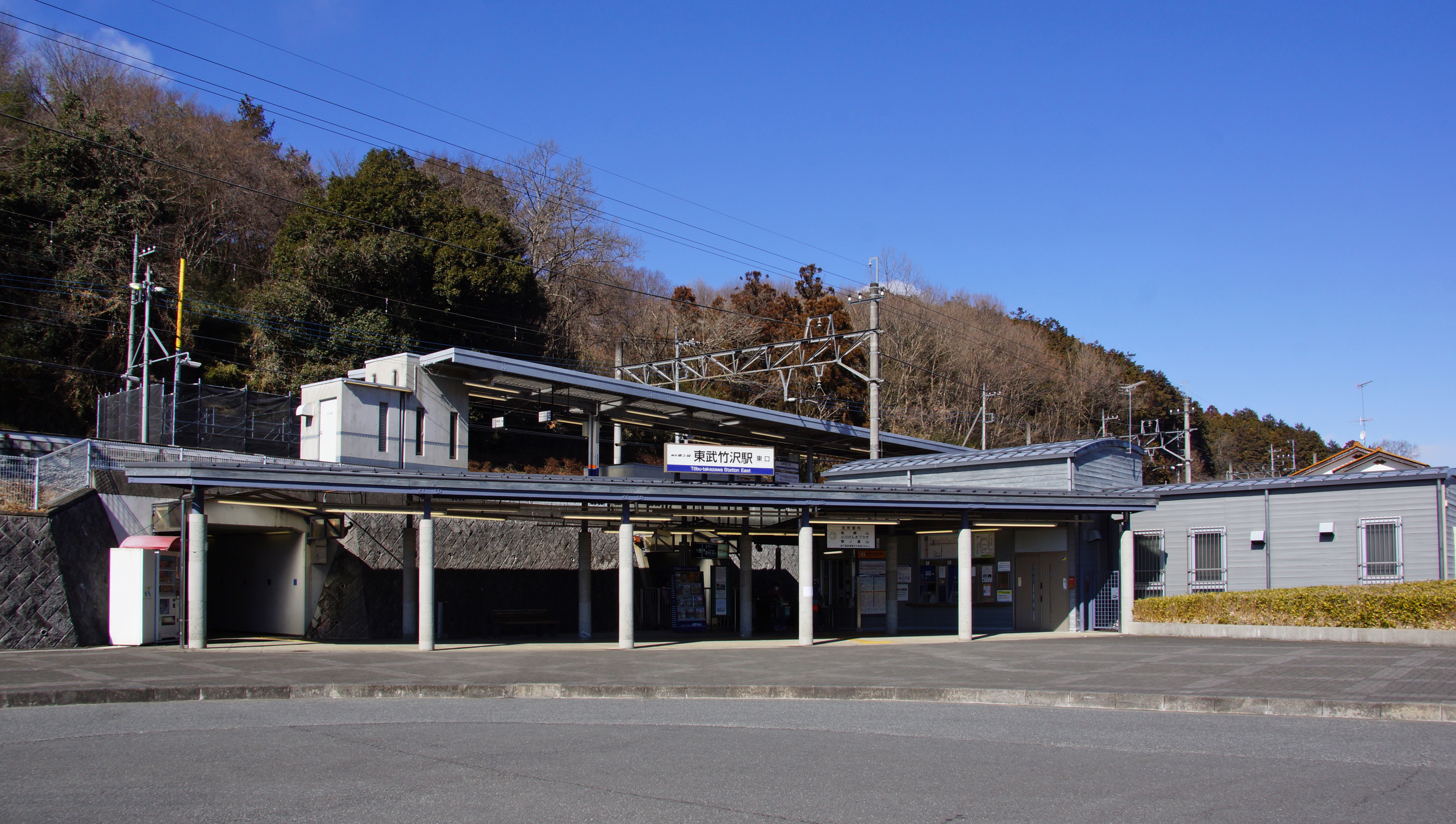
- The east entrance in February 2017

General information
- Location: 680–4 Yukie, Ogawa-machi, Hiki-gun, Saitama-ken 355-0331; Japan
- Coordinates: 36.0752°N 139.2378°E
- Operator: Tōbu Railway
- Line: Tobu Tojo Line
- Distance: 67.1 km from Ikebukuro
- Platforms: 1 island platform
- Tracks: 2

Other information
- Station code: TJ-34
- Website: Official website

History
- Opened: 23 July 1932
- Former names: Takezawa (until 1934)

Passengers
- FY2019: 877 daily

Services
Preceding station	Tobu Railway	Following station
Minami-yorii TJ35 towards Yorii	Tojo Line	Ogawamachi TJ33 Terminus
Location
- Location within Saitama Prefecture Location within Japan

Tōbu-Takezawa Station (東武竹沢駅, Tōbutakezawa-eki) is a passenger railway station located in the town of Ogawa, Saitama, Japan, operated by the private railway operator Tōbu Railway.

== Lines ==
Tōbu-Takezawa Station is served by the Tōbu Tōjō Line from Ikebukuro in Tokyo, and is located 67.1 km from the Ikebukuro terminus. During the daytime, the station is served by two "Local" (all-stations) trains per hour in each direction between Ogawamachi and Yorii. There are no direct trains to or from Ikebukuro.

== Station layout ==
The station consists of an island platform serving two tracks. The station building is located on the east side, and an entrance on the west side of the station leads to the east side entrance via a passageway underneath the tracks.

=== Platforms ===
1	■ Tōbu Tōjō Line	for Yorii
2	■ Tōbu Tōjō Line	for Ogawamachi, Kawagoe, Wakōshi, and Ikebukuro

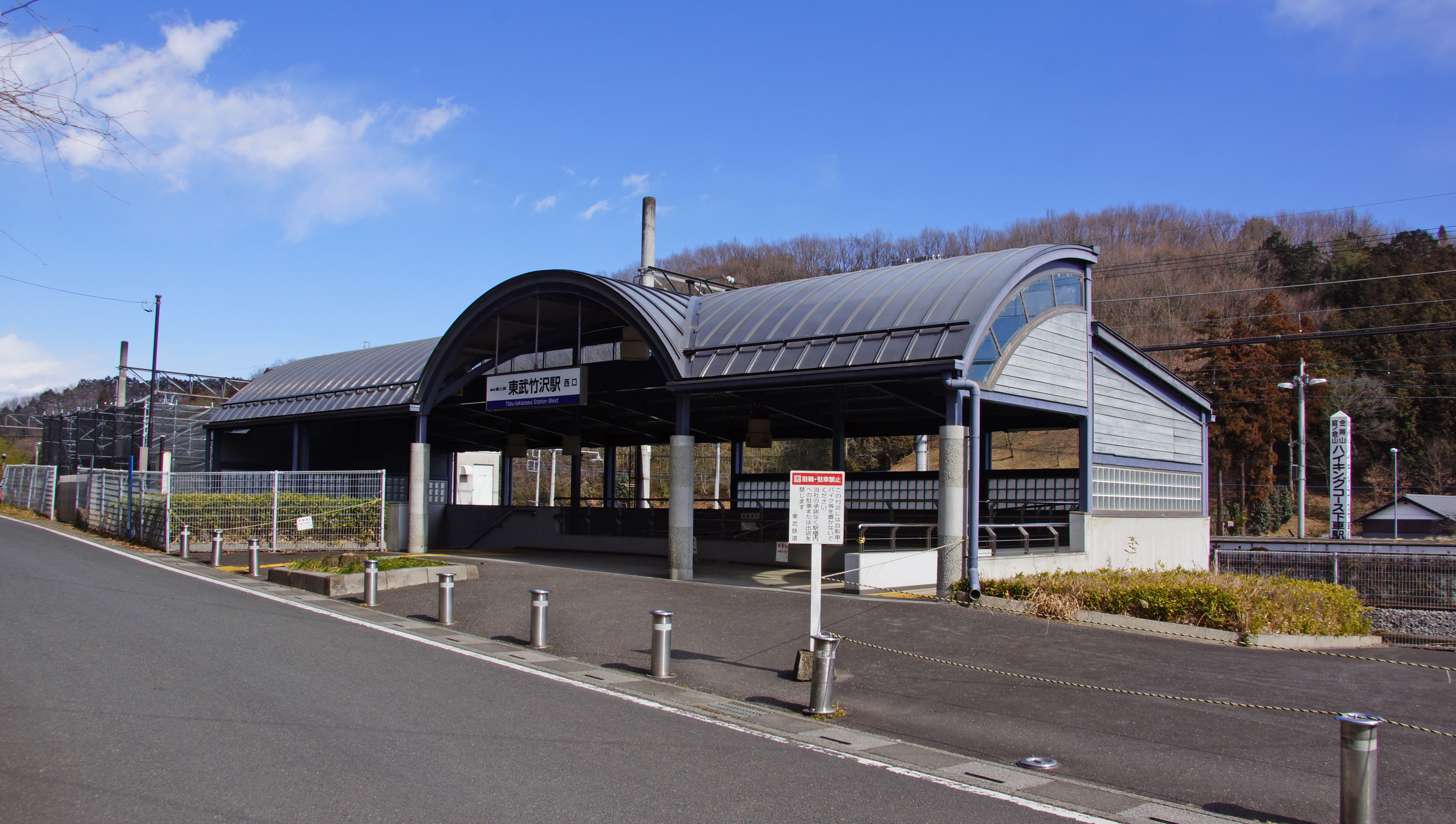
The west entrance in February 2017

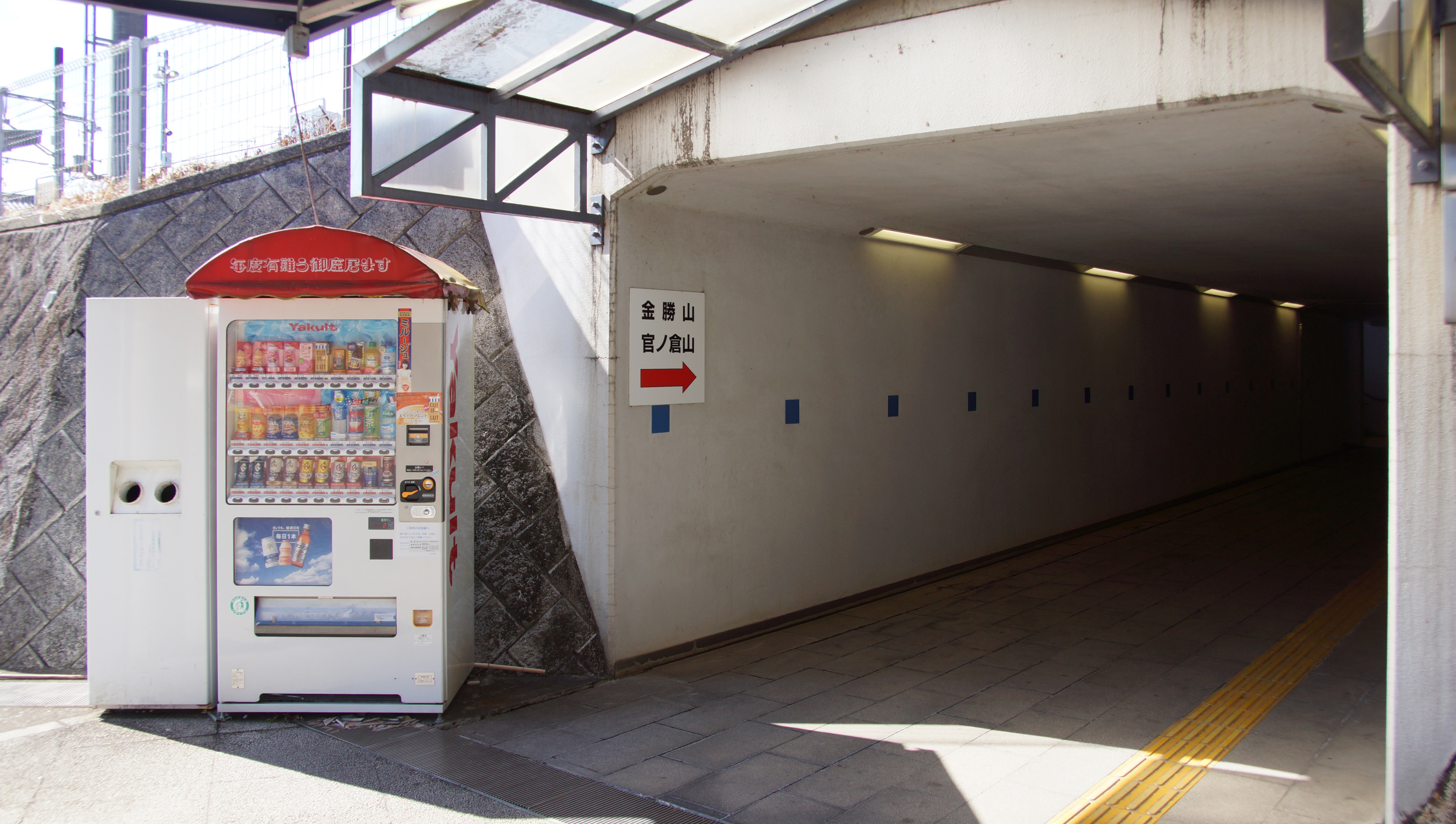
The connecting passage from the east side to west side in February 2017

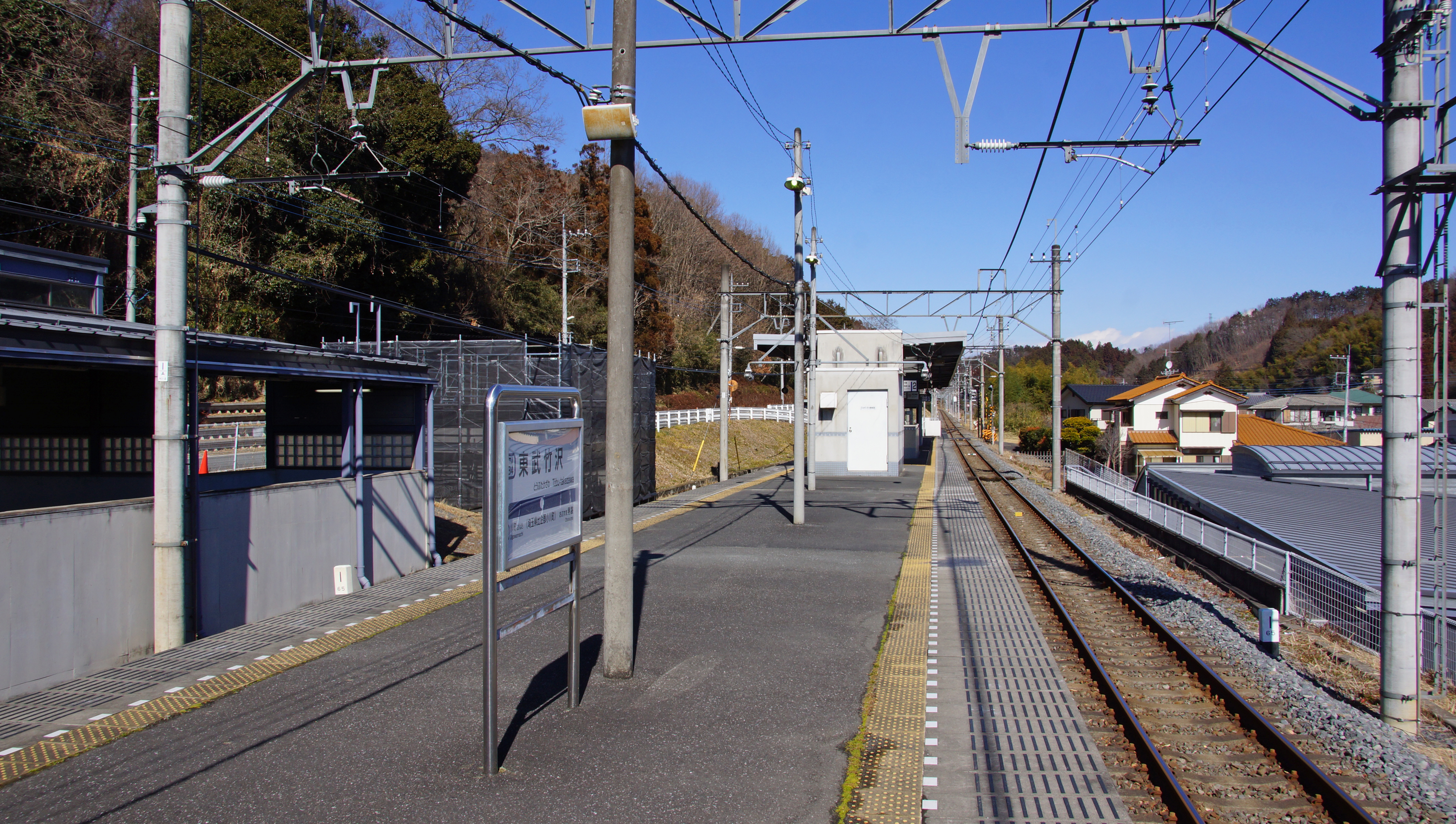
The view from the south end of the platforms looking north in February 2017

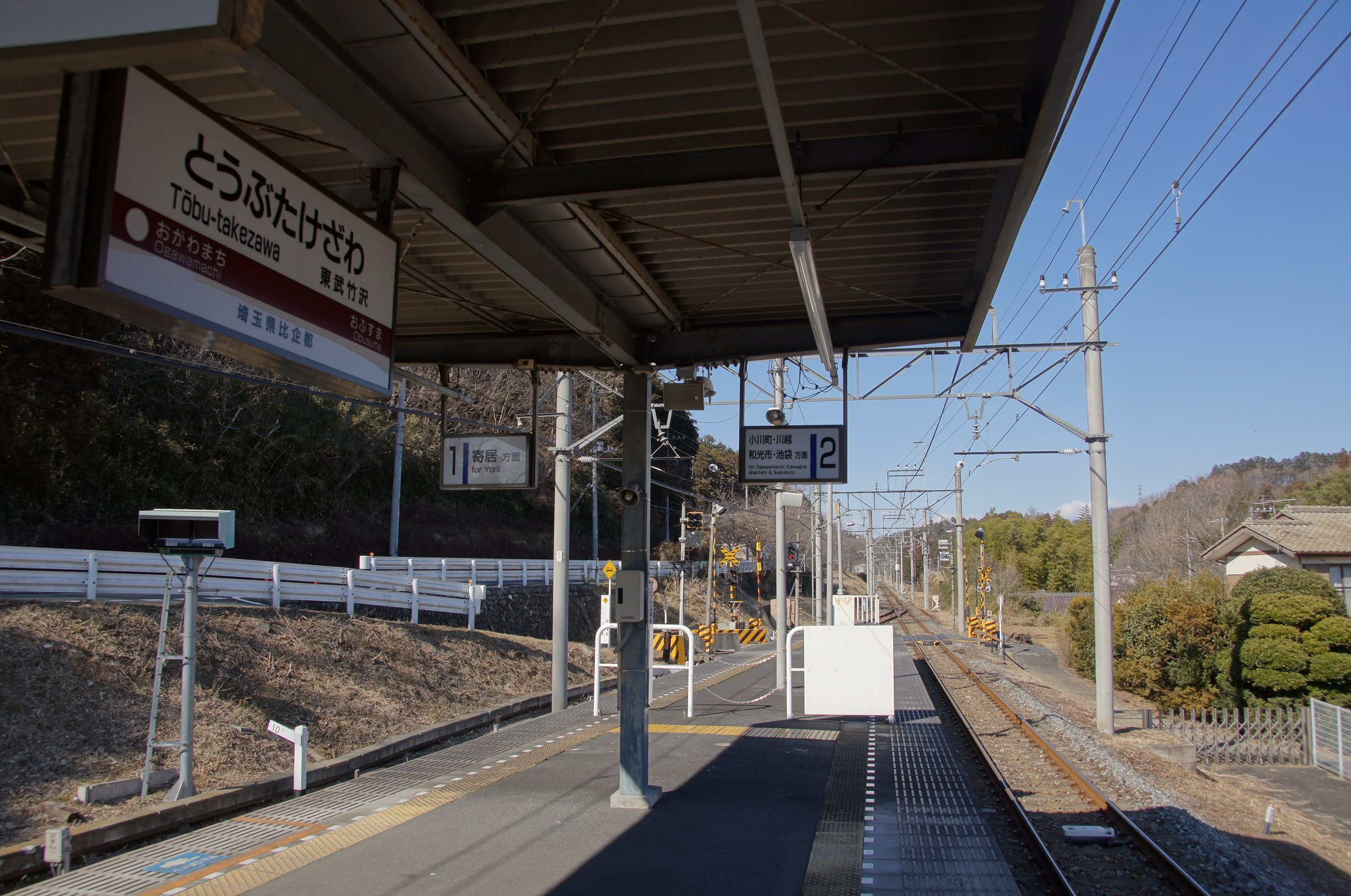
The view from the north end of the platforms showing the cordoned-off section in February 2012

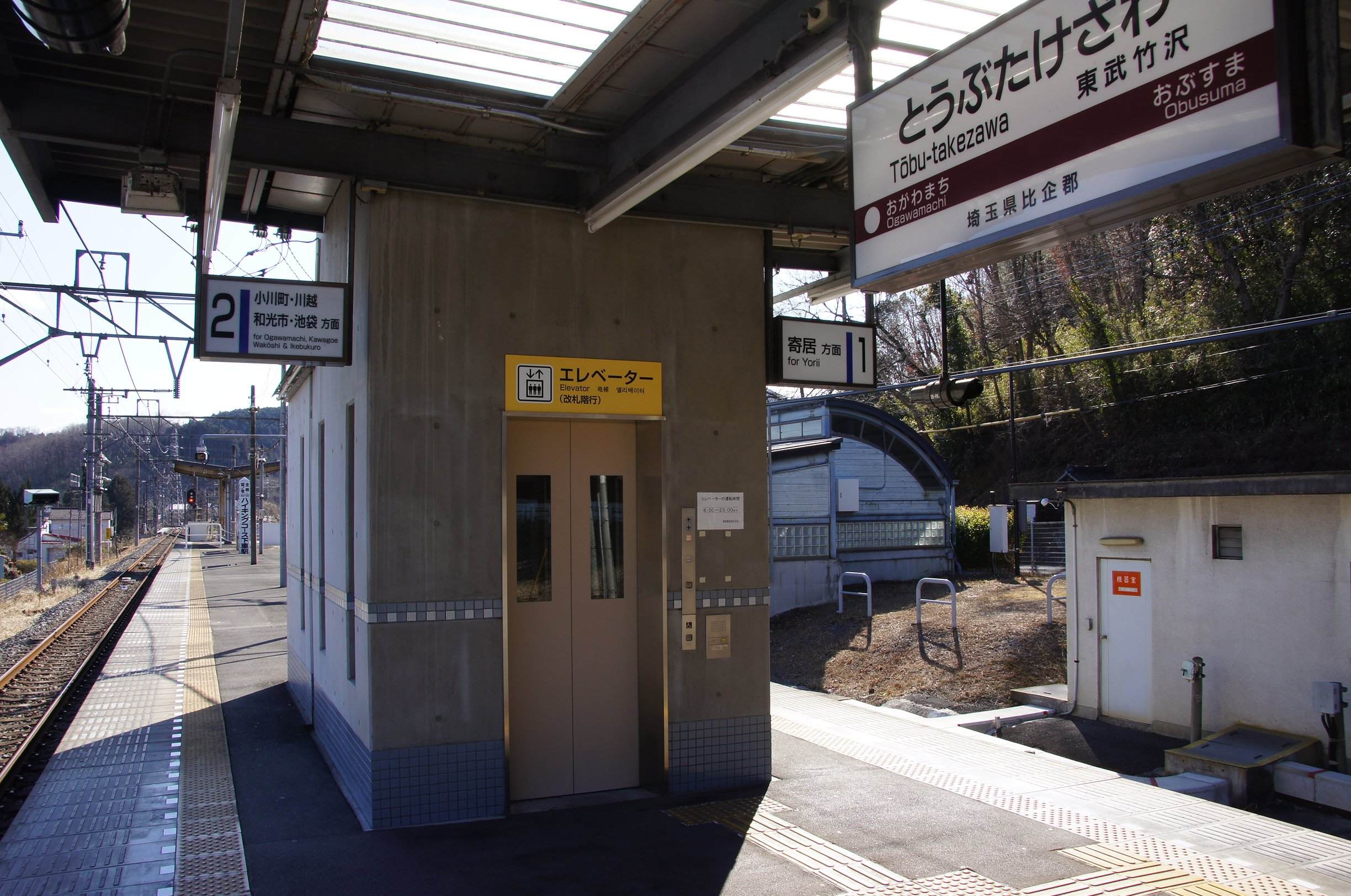
Lift access from the platform in February 2012

== History ==
The station opened on 23 July 1932 as Takezawa Station. It was renamed Tōbu-Takezawa Station on 1 July 1934 to differentiate it from Takezawa Station, which opened on the Japanese National Railways (now JR East) Hachikō Line in October 1934.

From 17 March 2012, station numbering was introduced on the Tōbu Tōjō Line, with Tōbu-Takezawa Station becoming "TJ-34".

== Passenger statistics ==
In fiscal 2019, the station was used by an average of 877 passengers daily.

== Surrounding area ==
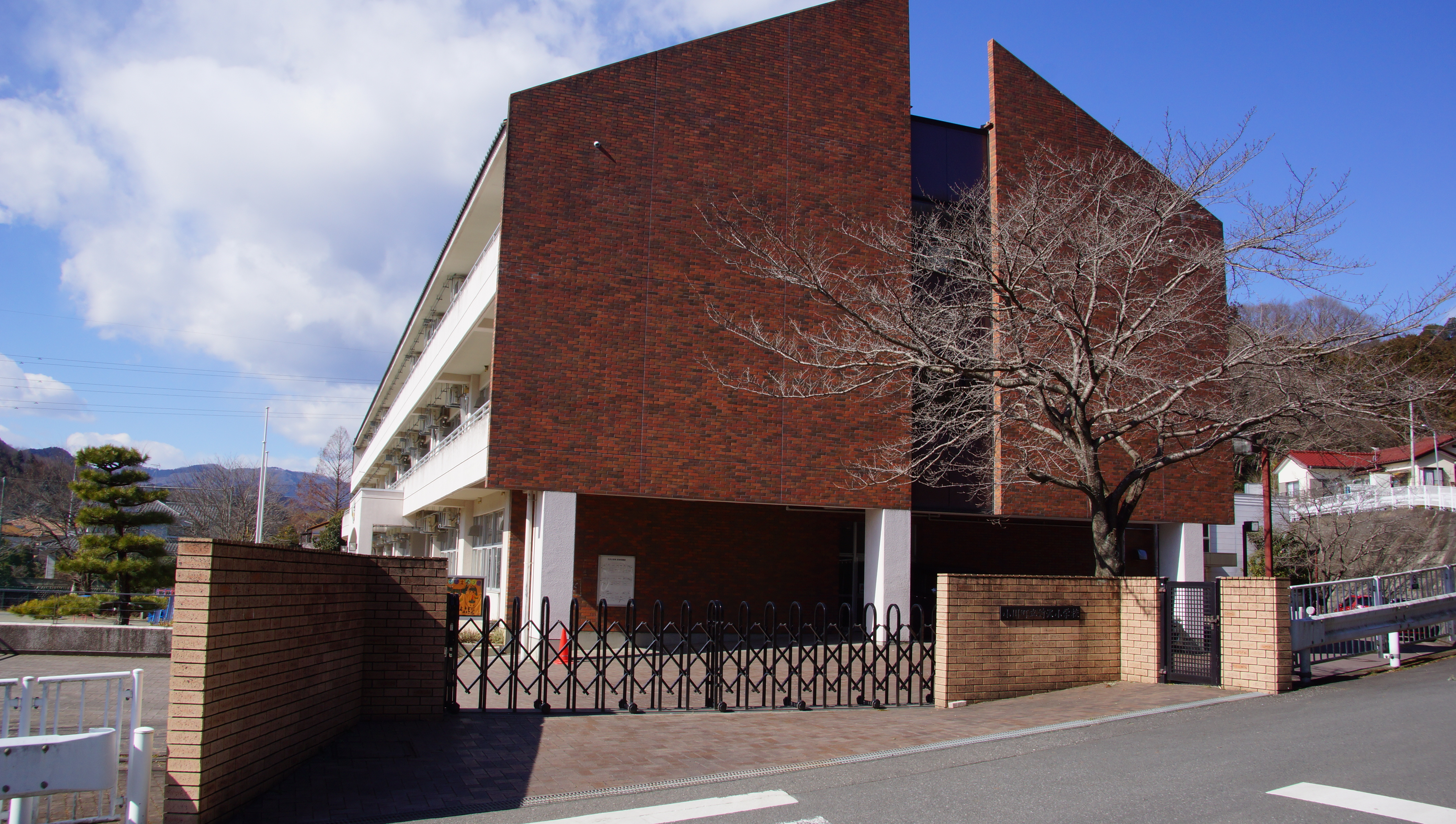
Takezawa Elementary School in February 2017

- Takezawa Station (JR Hachiko Line) (approximately 500 m away)
- National Route 254
- Takezawa Elementary School
- Tōbu-Takezawa Ekimae Post Office

== See also ==
- List of railway stations in Japan
