= Takezawa Station =

Railway station in Ogawa, Saitama Prefecture, Japan

Takezawa Station 竹沢駅
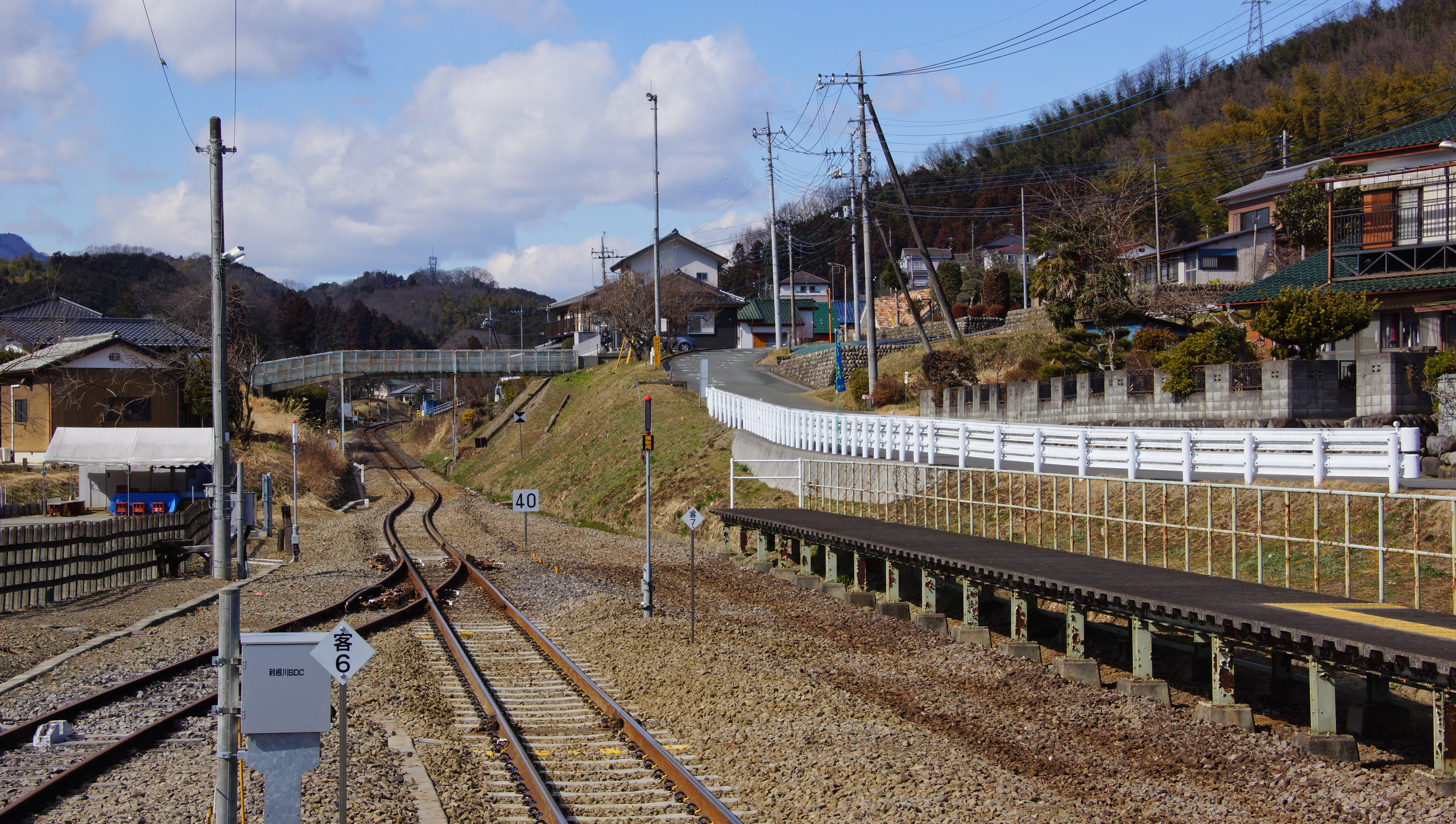
- View looking west from the platform in February 2017

General information
- Location: Suguro, Ogawa-machi, Hiki-gun, Saitama-ken 355–0336; Japan
- Coordinates: 36.0757°N 139.2302°E
- Operator: JR East
- Line: ■ Hachikō Line
- Distance: 56.3 km from Hachiōji
- Platforms: 1 side platform
- Tracks: 1

Other information
- Status: Unstaffed
- Website: Official website

History
- Opened: 6 October 1934
- Rebuilt: 2008

Passengers
- FY2010: 31 daily

Services
Preceding station	JR East	Following station
Orihara towards Takasaki	Hachikō Line	Ogawamachi towards Komagawa
Location
- Location within Saitama Prefecture Location within Japan

Takezawa Station (竹沢駅, Takezawa-eki) is a passenger railway station in the town of Ogawa, Saitama, Japan, operated by East Japan Railway Company (JR East).

== Lines ==
Takezawa Station is served by the unelectrified Hachiko Line between Komagawa and Takasaki, and is located 56.3 km from the starting point of the line at Hachiōji.

== Station layout ==
The station originally had two opposed side platforms serving two tracks, forming a passing loop on the single-track line, with the station building located on the south side and the platforms connected by a footbridge. From 15 October 2016, the up (for Komagawa) platform was decommissioned and the track removed, with trains in both directions using the remaining (former down) platform. The station is unattended.

=== Platforms ===
■ Hachiko Line	for Yorii and Takasaki for Ogawamachi and Komagawa

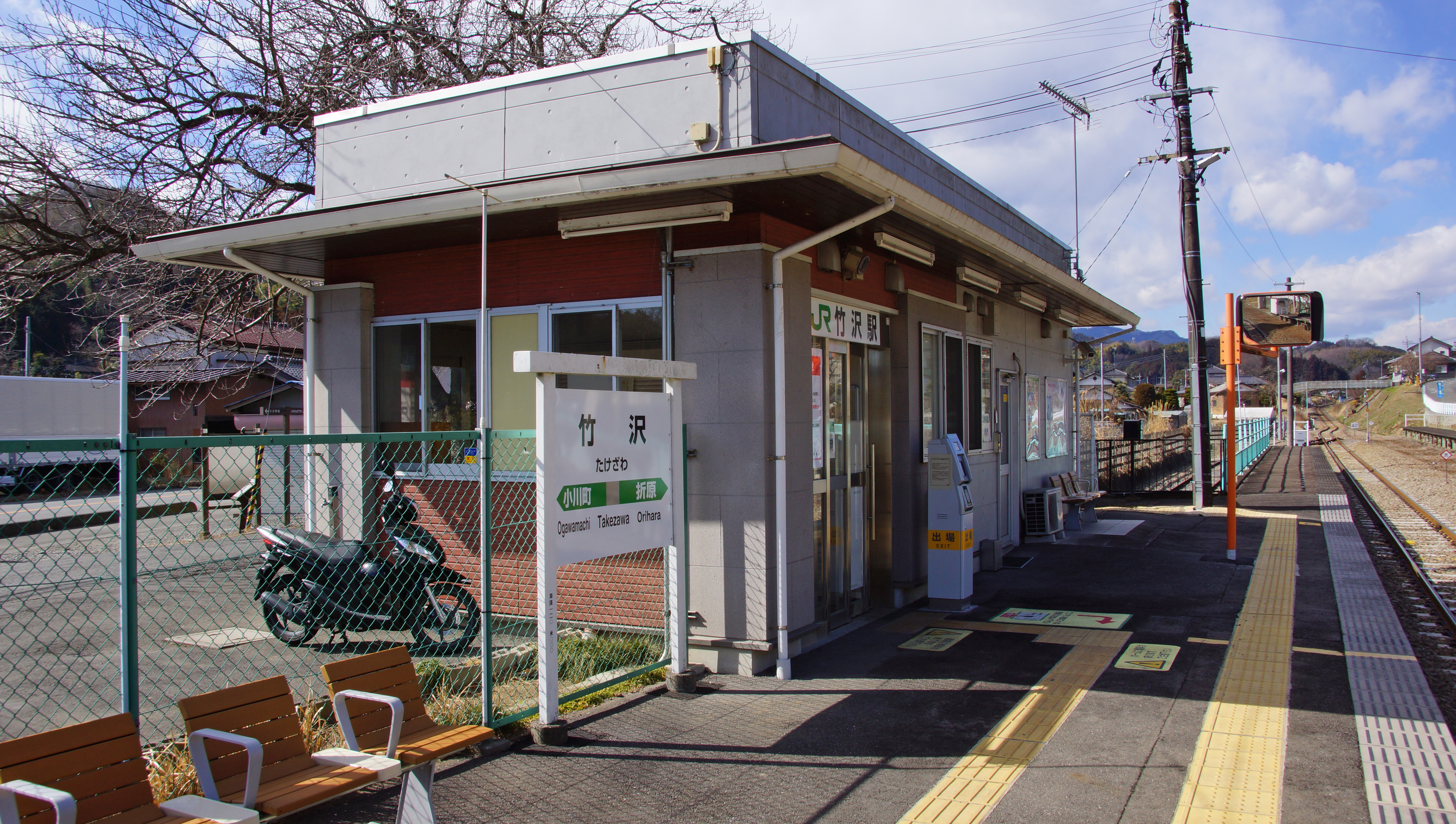
The platform side of the station building in February 2017

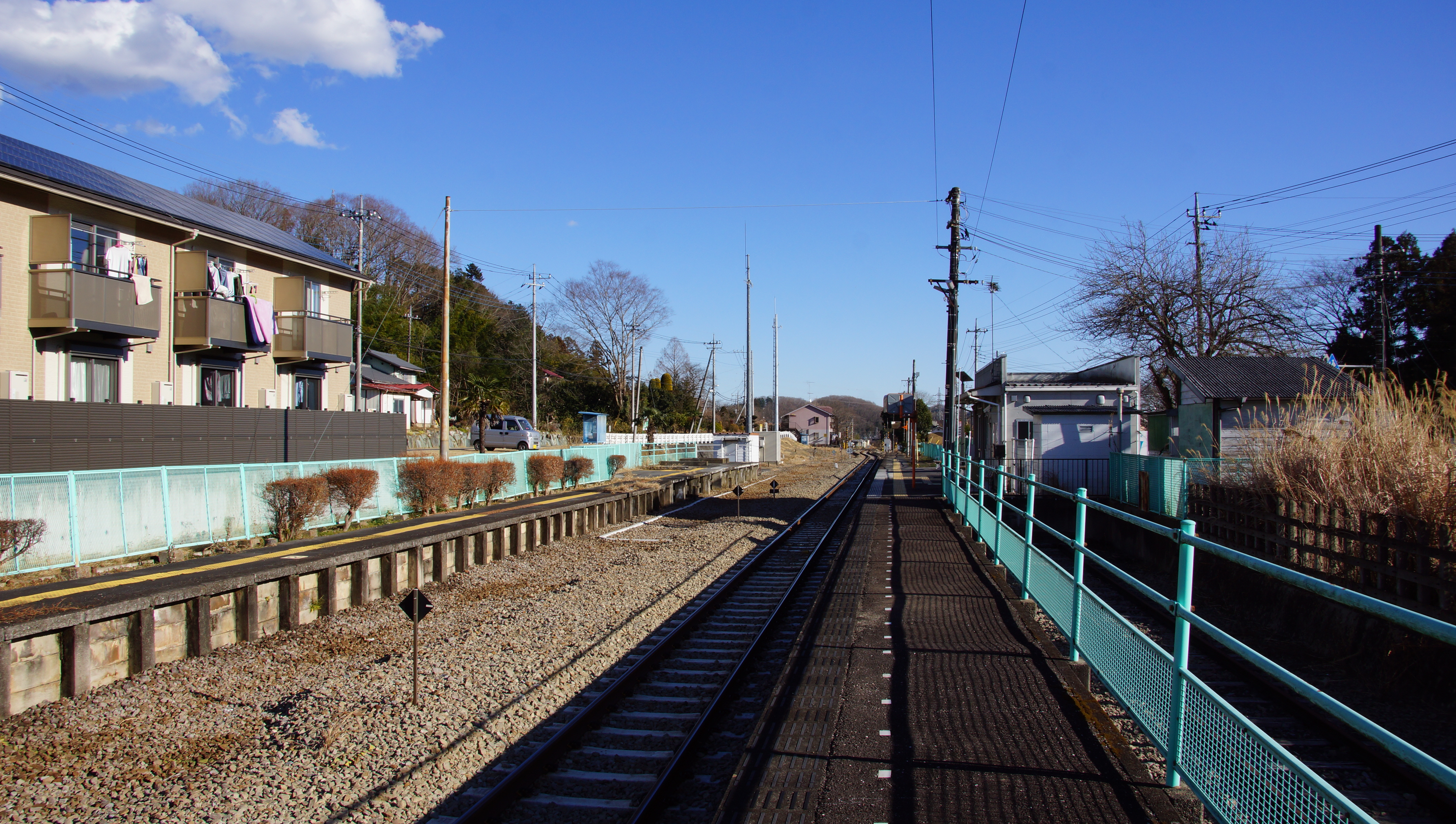
View looking east from the platform in January 2018, with the decommissioned former eastbound platform on the left

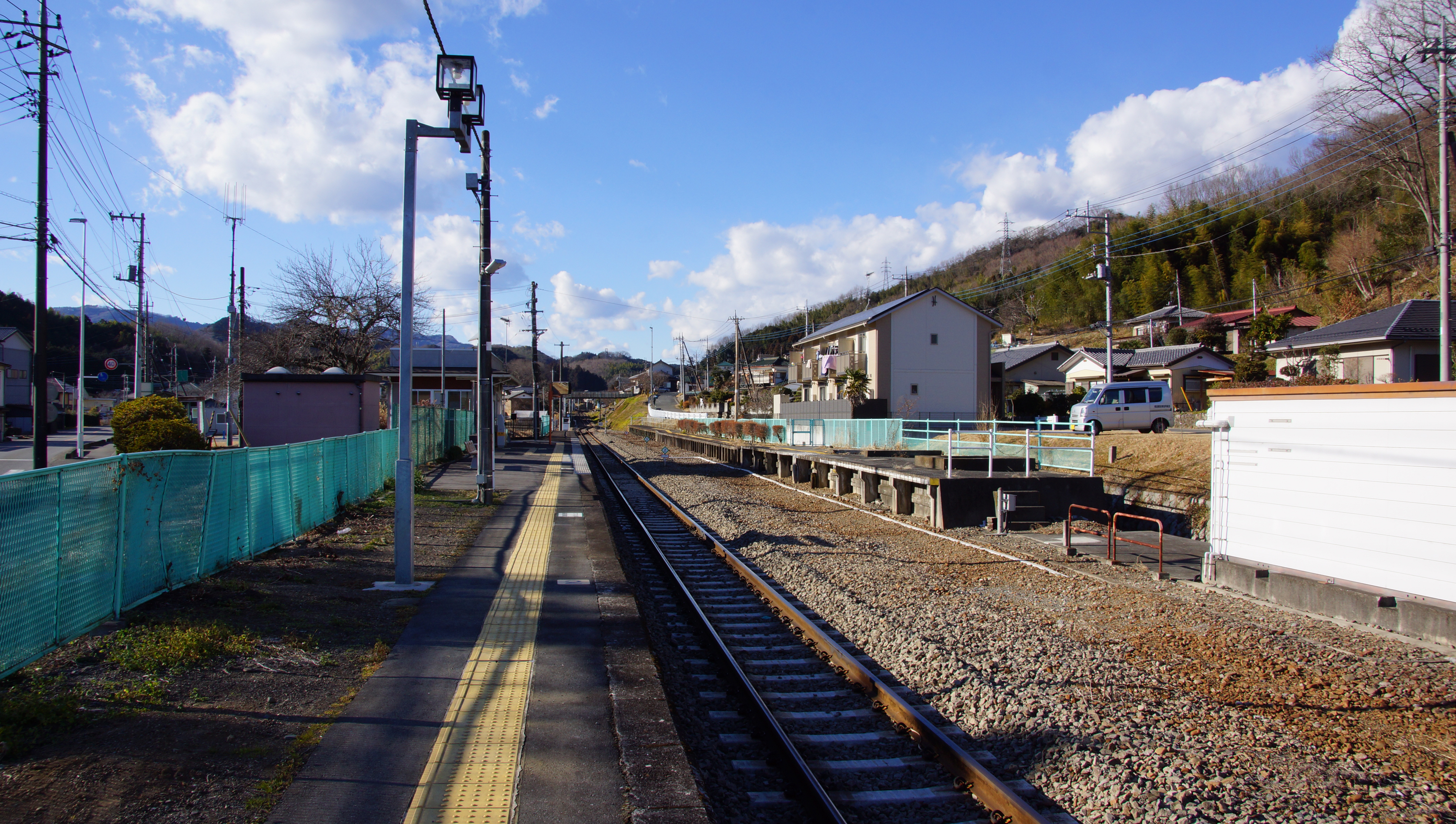
View looking west from the platform in January 2018, with the decommissioned former eastbound platform on the right

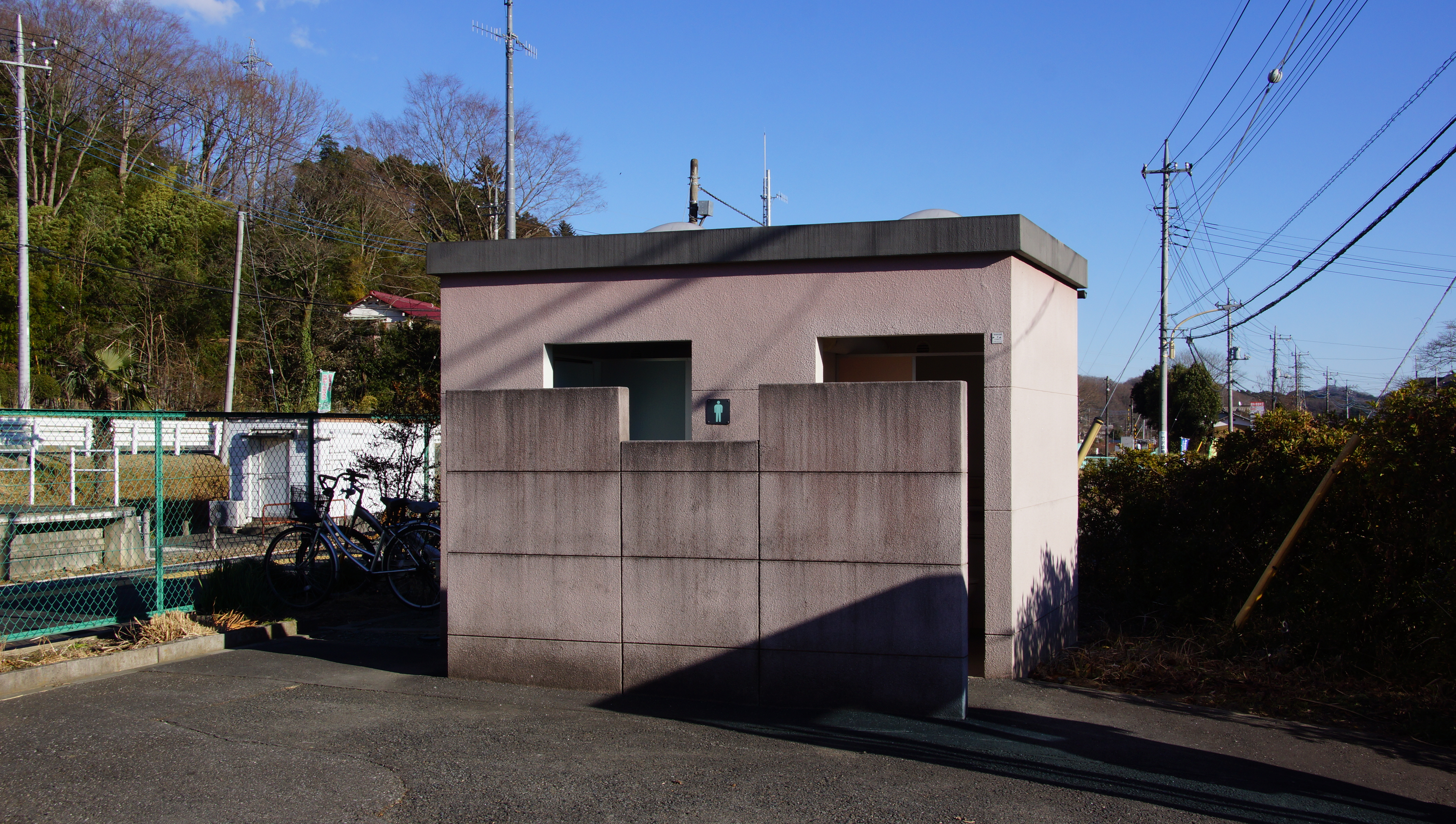
The toilets in the station forecourt in January 2018

The station entrance in March 2026

== History ==
The station opened on 6 October 1934. With the privatization of Japanese National Railways (JNR) on 1 April 1987, the station came under the control of JR East. The station building was rebuilt in 2008.

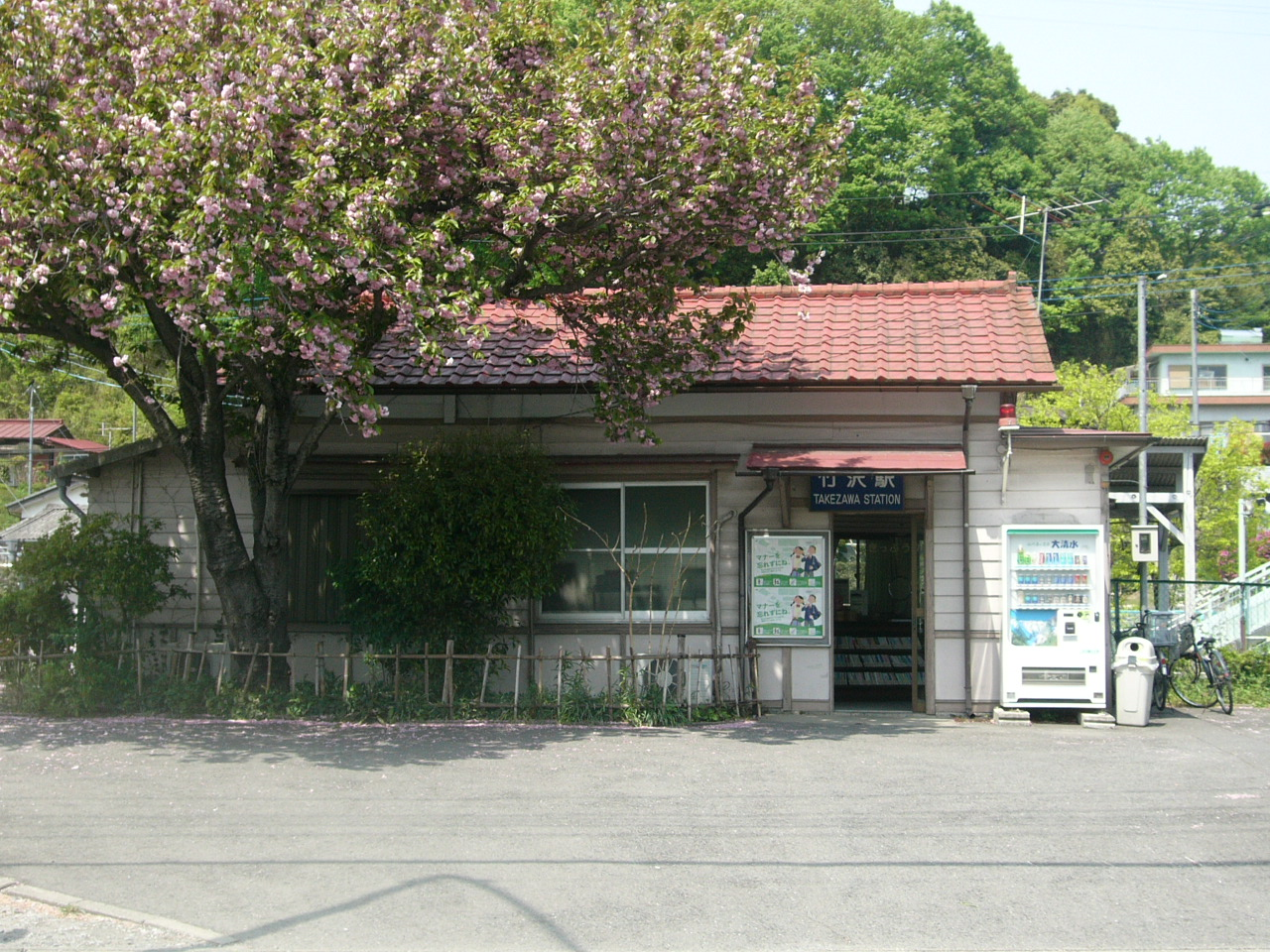
The previous station building in May 2006

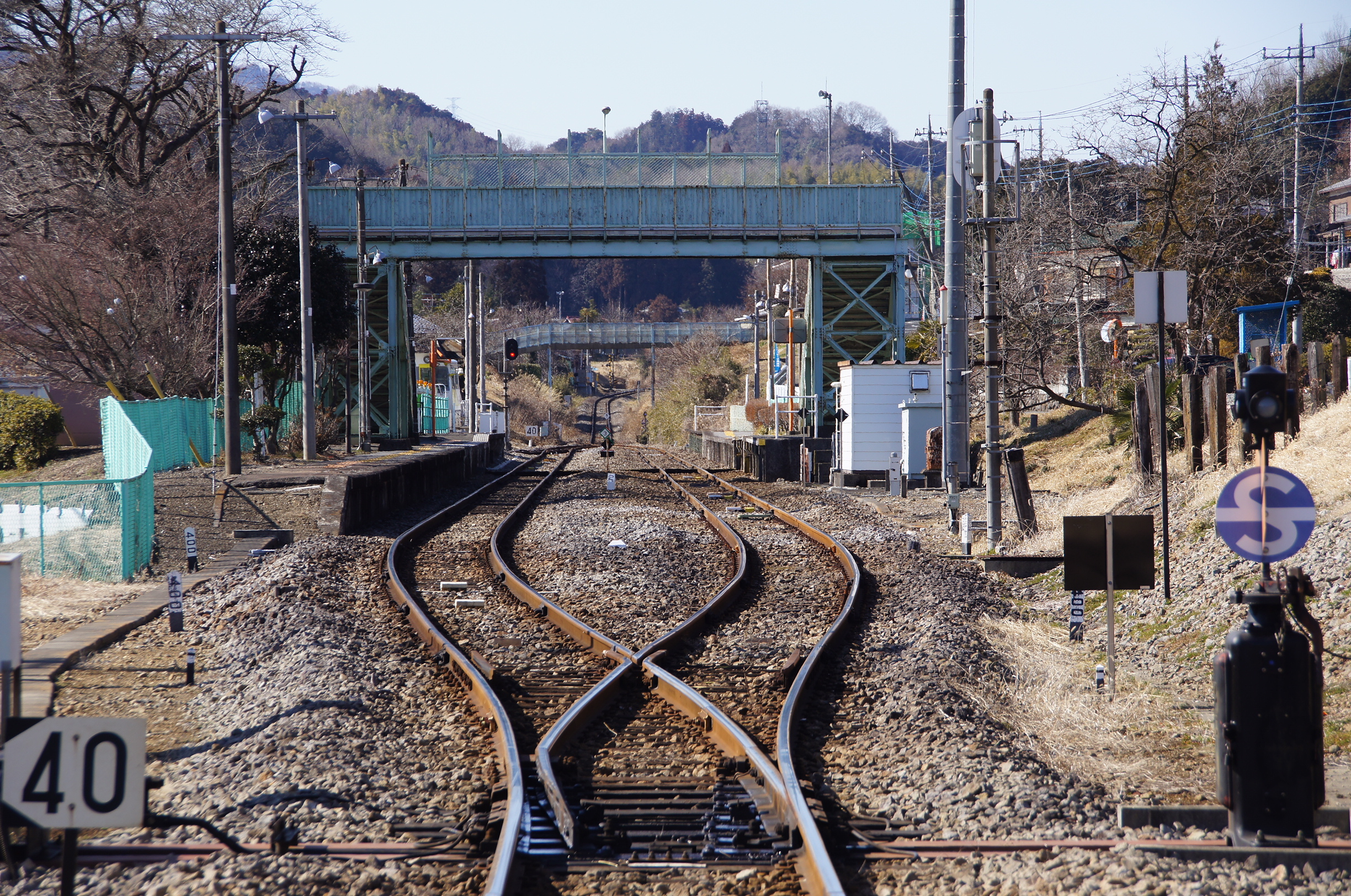
The station viewed from the east in 2012 before track singling

== Passenger statistics ==
In fiscal 2010, the station was used by an average of 31 passengers daily (boarding passengers only).

== Surrounding area ==
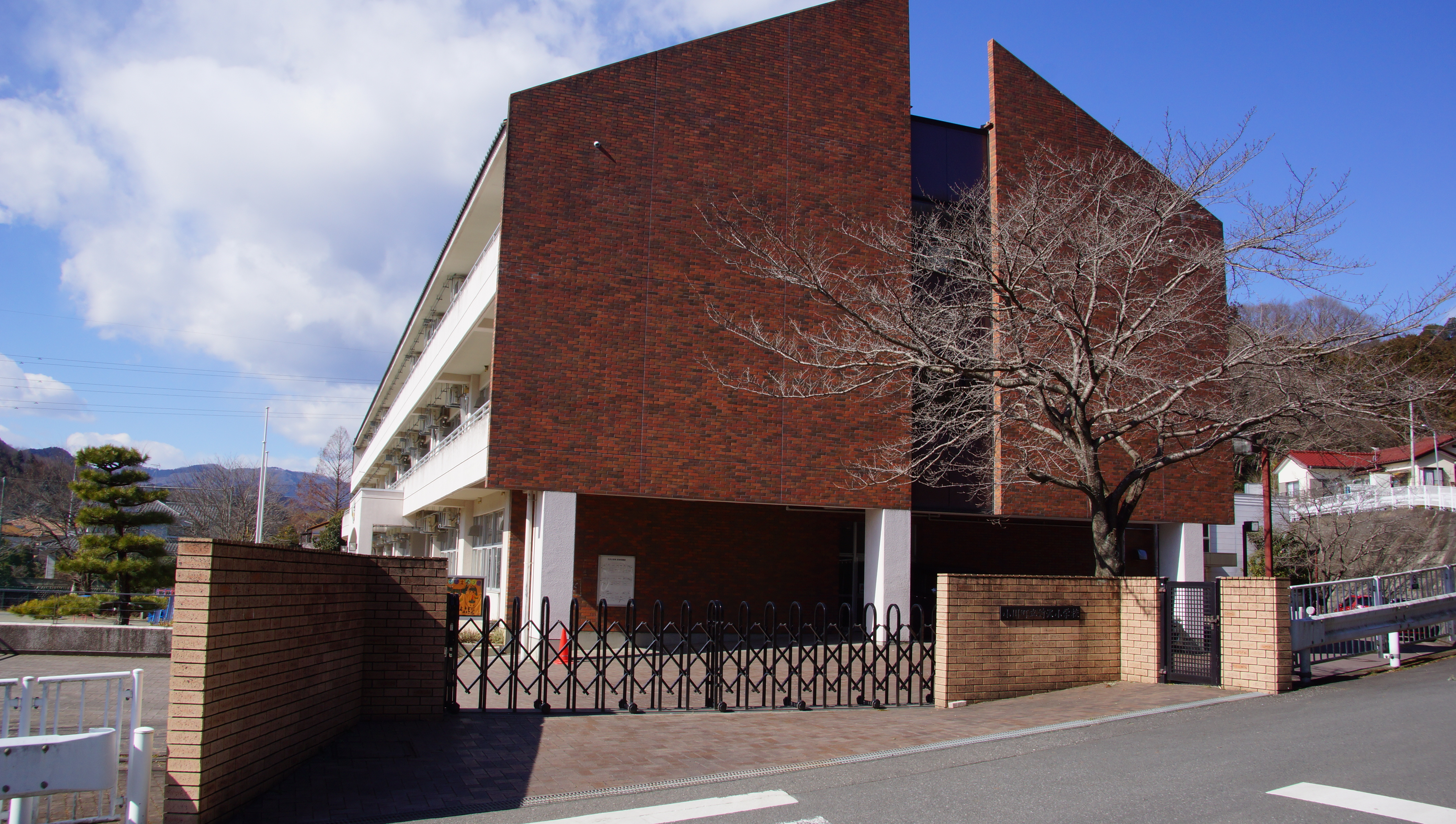
Takezawa Elementary School

- Tōbu Takezawa Station (Tobu Tojo Line) (approximately 500 m away)
- National Route 254
- Takezawa Elementary School

== See also ==
- List of railway stations in Japan
